Iran and the United States have had no formal diplomatic relations since April 7, 1980. Instead, Pakistan serves as Iran's protecting power in the United States, while Switzerland serves as the United States' protecting power in Iran. Contacts are carried out through the Iranian Interests Section of the Pakistani Embassy in Washington, D.C., and the US Interests Section of the Swiss Embassy in Tehran. In August 2018, Supreme Leader of Iran Ali Khamenei banned direct talks with the United States.

Relations between the two nations began in the mid-to-late 19th century, when Iran was known to the west as Persia. Persia was very wary of British and Russian colonial interests during the Great Game. By contrast, the United States was seen as a more trustworthy foreign power, and the Americans Arthur Millspaugh and Morgan Shuster were even appointed treasurers-general by the Shahs of the time. During World War II, Persia was invaded by the United Kingdom and the Soviet Union, both US allies, but relations continued to be positive after the war until the later years of the government of Mohammad Mosaddegh, who was overthrown by a coup organized by the Central Intelligence Agency and aided by MI6. This was followed by an era of very close alliance and friendship between Shah Mohammad Reza Pahlavi's regime and the US government, Persia being one of the US's closest allies, which was in turn followed by a dramatic reversal and disagreement between the two countries after the 1979 Iranian Revolution.

Opinions differ as to the cause of the cooling in relations. Iranian explanations include everything from the natural and unavoidable conflict between the Islamic Revolution on the one hand, and perceived American arrogance and desire for global hegemony on the other. Other explanations include the Iranian government's need for an external bogeyman to furnish a pretext for domestic repression against pro-democratic forces and to bind the government to its loyal constituency. The United States attributes the worsening of relations to the 1979–81 Iran hostage crisis, Iran's repeated human rights abuses since the Islamic Revolution, its anti-Western ideology and its nuclear program.

Since 1995, the United States has had an embargo on trade with Iran. In 2015, the United States led successful negotiations for a nuclear deal (the Joint Comprehensive Plan of Action) intended to place substantial limits on Iran's nuclear program, including more intrusive IAEA inspections as well as limitations on enrichment levels, and in 2016 most sanctions on Iran were lifted. The Trump administration unilaterally withdrew from the nuclear deal and re-imposed sanctions in 2018, initiating what became known as the "maximum pressure campaign" against Iran. In response, Iran began to gradually reduce its commitments under the nuclear deal and eventually exceeded pre-JCPOA enrichment levels. The two countries came close to open conflict during the 2019–2021 Persian Gulf crisis.

According to a 2013 BBC World Service poll, 5% of Americans view Iranian influence positively, with 87% expressing a negative view, the most unfavorable perception of Iran in the world. On the other hand, research has shown that most Iranians hold a positive attitude about the American people, though not the US government. According to a 2019 survey by IranPoll, 13% of Iranians have a favorable view of the United States, with 86% expressing an unfavorable view, the most unfavorable perception of the United States in the world. According to a 2018 Pew poll, 39% of Americans say that limiting the power and influence of Iran should be a top foreign policy priority. Relations tend to improve when the two countries have overlapping goals, such as repelling Sunni militants during the Iraq War and the intervention against ISIS.

Early relations 
American newspapers in the 1720s were uniformly pro-Iranian, especially during the revolt of Afghan emir Mahmud Hotak against the Safavid dynasty. 

Political relations between Iran (Persia) and the United States began when the Shah of Iran, Nassereddin Shah Qajar, officially dispatched Iran's first ambassador, Mirza Abolhasan to Washington, D.C., in 1856. In 1883, Samuel G. W. Benjamin was appointed by the United States as the first official diplomatic envoy to Iran; however, ambassadorial relations were not established until 1944. The first Iranian Ambassador to the United States of America was Mirza Albohassan Khan Ilchi Kabir. Justin Perkins and Asahel Grant were the first missionaries dispatched to Iran in 1834 via the American Board of Commissioners for Foreign Missions.

The US had little interest in Persian affairs, while US as a trustworthy outsider did not suffer. The Persians again sought the US for help in straightening out its finances after World War I. This mission unlike the last was opposed by powerful vested interests and eventually it was withdrawn with its task incomplete. Following this there was no special US concern with Iran or any interaction until World War II.

Amir Kabir, Prime Minister under Nasereddin Shah, also initiated direct contacts with the American government in Washington. By the end of the 19th century, negotiations were underway for an American company to establish a railway system from the Persian Gulf to Tehran.

Until World War II, relations between Iran and the United States remained cordial. As a result, many Iranians sympathetic to the Persian Constitutional Revolution came to view the US as a "third force" in their struggle to expel British and Russian dominance in Persian affairs. American industrial and business leaders were supportive of Iran's drive to modernize its economy and to expel British and Russian influence from the country.

During the Persian Constitutional Revolution in 1909, an American named Howard Baskerville died in Tabriz while fighting with a militia in a battle against royalist forces. After the Iranian parliament appointed United States financier Morgan Shuster as Treasurer General of Iran in 1911, an American was killed in Tehran by gunmen thought to be affiliated with Russian or British interests. Shuster became even more active in supporting the Constitutional revolution of Iran financially. When Iran's government ordered Shu'a al-Saltaneh (شعاع السلطنه), the Shah's brother who was aligned with the goals of Imperial Russia in Iran, to surrender his assets, Shuster moved to execute the seizure. Imperial Russia immediately landed troops in Bandar Anzali, demanding a recourse and apology from the Persian government. Russia's General Liakhov subsequently shelled Iran's parliament in Tehran as part of actions to protect Russia's interests during the chain of events, and Morgan Shuster was forced to resign under British and Russian pressure. Shuster's book The Strangling of Persia is a recount of the details of these events and is critical of British and Russian influence in Persia.

The American Embassy first reported to the Iran desk at the Foreign Office in London about the popular view of Britain's involvement in the 1921 coup that brought Reza Shah to power. A British Embassy report from 1932 admitted that the British government put Reza Shah "on the throne". At that time, Iran did not view the United States as an ally of Britain.

In 1936, Iran withdrew its ambassador in Washington after the publication of an article criticizing Reza Shah in the New York Daily Herald. The withdrawal lasted for nearly one year.

Morgan Shuster was soon followed by Arthur Millspaugh, who was appointed Treasurer General by Reza Shah, and Arthur Pope, who was a main driving force behind the Persian Empire revivalist policies of Reza Shah. The friendly relations between the United States and Iran lasted until the 1950s.

Reign of the last Shah of Iran 

In 1941 the Anglo-Soviet invasion of Iran deposed Reza Shah because of his lean toward the Axis. The invaders established a supply route of massive shipments of Lend lease war material to the Soviet Union. From 1942 US troops were involved in the operation of this Persian Corridor.

The last Shah of Iran, Mohammad Reza Pahlavi, maintained close ties with the United States during most of his reign, which lasted from 1941 until 1979. He pursued a modernizing economic policy, and a strongly pro-American foreign policy; he also made a number of visits to America, where he was regarded as a friend.

Iran's long border with America's Cold War rival, the Soviet Union, and its position as the largest, most powerful country in the oil-rich Persian Gulf, made Iran a "pillar" of US foreign policy in the Middle East. Prior to the Iranian Revolution of 1979, many Iranian students and other citizens resided in the United States, and had a positive and welcoming attitude towards America and Americans. In the 1970s, approximately 25,000 American technicians were deployed to Iran in order to maintain military equipment (such as F-14s) that had been sold to the Shah's government. Additionally, from 1950 to 1979, an estimated 800,000 to 850,000 Americans had visited or lived in Iran, and had often expressed their admiration for the Iranian people.

Prime Minister Mossadeq and his overthrow 
In 1953, the government of prime minister Mohammed Mossadeq was overthrown in a coup organized by the CIA and MI6. Many liberal Iranians believe that the coup and the subsequent U.S. support for the shah proved largely responsible for his arbitrary rule, which led to the "deeply anti-American character" of the 1979 revolution.
One of the results of the 1953 coup was that the U.S. took about 40% of Britain's share of Iranian oil as part of the wider transition from British to American dominance in the region, and indeed worldwide.

Until the outbreak of World War II, the United States had no active policy toward Iran. When the Cold War began, the United States was alarmed by the attempt by the Soviet Union to set up separatist states in Iranian Azerbaijan and Kurdistan, as well as its demand for military rights to the Dardanelles in 1946. This fear was enhanced by the loss of China to communism, the uncovering of Soviet spy rings, and the start of the Korean War.

In 1952 and 1953, the Abadan Crisis took place when Iranian prime minister Mohammed Mossadeq began nationalization of the Anglo-Iranian Oil Company (AIOC). Established by the British in the early 20th century, the company shared profits (85% for Britain, and 15% for Iran), but the company withheld their financial records from the Iranian government. By 1951, Iranians supported nationalization of the AIOC, and Parliament unanimously agreed to nationalize its holding of, what was at the time, the British Empire's largest company. The British government retaliated with an embargo on Iranian oil, which was supported by international oil companies. Over the following months, negotiations over control and compensation for the oil were deadlocked, and Iran's economy deteriorated.

U.S. President Harry S. Truman pressed Britain to moderate its position in the negotiations and to not invade Iran. American policies created a feeling in Iran that the United States was on Mossadeq's side and optimism that the oil dispute would soon be settled with "a series of innovative proposals to settle" the dispute, giving Iran "significant amounts of economic aid". Mossadeq visited Washington, and the American government made "frequent statements expressing support for him."

At the same time, the United States honored the British embargo and, without Truman's knowledge, the Central Intelligence Agency station in Tehran had been "carrying out covert activities" against Mosaddeq and the National Front "at least since the summer of 1952".

1953 Iranian coup d'état 

As the Cold War intensified, oil negotiations stalled, and the Republican President Dwight D. Eisenhower replaced Democratic President Harry S. Truman, the United States helped destabilize Mosaddeq on the theory that "rising internal tensions and continued economic deterioration...might lead to a breakdown of government authority and open the way for at least a gradual assumption of control" by Iran's well organized Tudeh communist party. In spring and summer 1953, the Central Intelligence Agency and MI6 carried out  Operation Ajax, conducted from the American Embassy in Tehran, helping to organize a coup d'état to overthrow the Mossadeq government. The operation initially failed, and the Shah fled to Italy, but a second attempt succeeded, and Mosaddeq was imprisoned.

According to a study of the coup headed by Mark J. Gasiorowski and Malcolm Byrne, intended "to resolve" the "controversy" over who and what were responsible, wrote that "it was geostrategic considerations, rather than a desire to destroy Mosaddeq's movement, to establish a dictatorship in Iran or to gain control over Iran's oil, that persuaded U.S. officials to undertake the coup." Gasiorowski concludes the study; "Consequently, while the
United States delivered the final blow to Mosaddeq's regime, Iranian actors —
together with the British and the major international oil companies — played
crucial roles as well.". The events leading to the coup were directly precipitated by Iran's nationalization of oil. Prior to nationalization, the Anglo-Iranian Oil Company (AIOC) had control over Iran's oil. After the coup, in 1954, oil control was 40% AIOC (which had been renamed British Petroleum), 40% US oil companies, 13% Royal Dutch/Shell, and 6% CFP (French).

In an editorial celebrating the coup, the New York Times stated, "Underdeveloped countries with rich resources now have an object lesson in the heavy cost that must be paid by one of their number which goes berserk with fanatical nationalism."

Post-coup 

Following the coup, the United States financed the re-installed Shah. In the first three weeks, Washington gave Iran $68 million in emergency aid, and an additional $1.2 billion over the next decade. In this era that ensued, until the fall of the Shah in 1979, Iran was one of the United States' closest allies. The US also played a critical role in founding the Shah's brutal secret police to keep him in power. A US Army colonel working for the CIA was sent to Persia in September 1953 to guide local personnel in creating the organization and in March 1955, the Army colonel was "replaced with a more permanent team of five career CIA officers, including specialists in covert operations, intelligence analysis, and counterintelligence, including Major General Herbert Norman Schwarzkopf who "trained virtually all of the first generation of SAVAK personnel." In 1956 this agency was reorganized and given the name Sazeman-e Ettela'at va Amniyat-e Keshvar (SAVAK). These in turn were replaced by SAVAK's own instructors in 1965.

The Shah received significant American support during his reign. He frequently made state visits to the White House, and received praise from numerous American presidents. The Shah's close ties to Washington and his modernization policies soon angered some Iranians, especially the hardcore Islamic conservatives.

In America, the coup was originally considered a triumph of covert action but later on came to be considered by many to have left "a haunting and terrible legacy." In 2000, Secretary of State Madeleine Albright, called it a "setback for democratic government" in Iran. Supreme Leader Ali Khamenei condemned the admission as "deceitful", complaining that it "did not even include an apology".

Nuclear support 
The U.S. helped Iran create its nuclear program starting in 1957 by providing Iran its first nuclear reactor and nuclear fuel, and after 1967 by providing Iran with weapons grade enriched uranium.

Iran's nuclear program was launched in the 1950s with the help of the United States as part of the Atoms for Peace program. The participation of the U.S. and Western European governments continued until the 1979 Iranian Revolution. 
After that while the non-aligned nations had actively supported Iran's right to enrich uranium for years, the U.S. and E.U. assert that Iran poses the greatest threat to international peace. The United States has reported Arab support for its stance on Iran here.
However, in multiple polls, Arab people have indicated that they do not see it as a serious threat. They consider Israel and America a danger.
The United States reached a deal in 2015 to limit Iran's nuclear capabilities. Sanctions relief under the terms of the deal freed over 100 billion dollars in frozen assets overseas for Iran and increased foreign access to the Iranian economy. In return, Iran had to temporarily agree not to engage in activities, including research and development of a nuclear bomb. The United States withdrew from the deal in 2018.

Cultural relations 
Relations in the cultural sphere remained cordial until 1979. Pahlavi University, Sharif University of Technology, and Isfahan University of Technology, three of Iran's top academic universities were all directly modeled on American institutions, such as the University of Chicago, MIT, and the University of Pennsylvania. The Shah was generous in awarding American universities with financial gifts. For example, the University of Southern California received an endowed chair of petroleum engineering, and a million dollar donation was given to the George Washington University to create an Iranian Studies program.

Growth of oil revenues 
In the 1960s and 1970s, Iran's oil revenues grew considerably. Starting in the mid-1960s, this "weakened U.S. influence in Iranian politics" while strengthening the power of the Iranian state vis-a-vis the Iranian public. According to scholar Homa Katouzian, this put the United States "in the contradictory position of being regarded" by the Iranian public because of the 1953 coup "as the chief architect and instructor of the regime," while "its real influence" in domestic Iranian politics and policies "declined considerably". With the oil revenue growing excessively the United States and Iran's relationship grew stronger and more stable.

James Bill and other historians have said that between 1969 and 1974 U.S. President Richard Nixon actively recruited the Shah as an American puppet and proxy. However, Richard Alvandi argues that it worked the other way around, with the Shah taking the initiative. President Nixon, who had first met the Shah in 1953, regarded him as a modernizing anticommunist statesman who deserved American support now that the British were withdrawing from the region. They met in 1972 and the Shah agreed to buy large quantities of expensive American military hardware and took responsibility for ensuring political stability and fighting off Soviet subversion throughout the region.

1977–79: Carter administration 

In the late 1970s, American President Jimmy Carter emphasized human rights in his foreign policy, but went easy in private with the Shah. By 1977 it had garnered unfavorable publicity in the international community for its bad human rights record. That year, the Shah responded to Carter's "polite reminder" by granting amnesty to some prisoners and allowing the Red Cross to visit prisons. Through 1977, liberal opposition formed organizations and issued open letters denouncing the Shah's regime.

At the same time, Carter angered anti-Shah Iranians with a New Year's Eve 1978 toast to the Shah in which he said:
Under the Shah's brilliant leadership Iran is an island of stability in one of the most troublesome regions of the world. There is no other state figure whom I could appreciate and like more.

Observers disagree over the nature of United States policy toward Iran under Carter as the Shah's regime crumbled. According to historian Nikki Keddie, the Carter administration followed "no clear policy" on Iran. The American ambassador to Iran, William H. Sullivan, recalled that the US National Security Advisor Zbigniew Brzezinski "repeatedly assured Pahlavi that the U.S. backed him fully". On November 4, 1978, Brzezinski called the Shah to tell him that the United States would "back him to the hilt." At the same time, high-level officials in the State Department believed the revolution was unstoppable. After visiting the Shah in summer of 1978, Secretary of the Treasury W. Michael Blumenthal complained of the Shah's emotional collapse, reporting, "You've got a zombie out there." Brzezinski and Energy Secretary James Schlesinger were adamant in their assurances that the Shah would receive military support.

Another scholar, sociologist Charles Kurzman, argues that, rather than being indecisive or sympathetic to the revolution, the Carter administration was consistently supportive of the Shah and urged the Iranian military to stage a "last-resort coup d'état" even after the regime's cause was hopeless.

Islamic Revolution 

The Islamic Revolution (1978–1979) ousted the pro-American Shah and replaced him with the anti-American Supreme Leader Ayatollah Ruhollah Khomeini, surprised the United States government, its State Department and intelligence services, which "consistently underestimated the magnitude and long-term implications of this unrest". Six months before the revolution culminated, the CIA had produced a report, stating that "Iran is not in a revolutionary or even a 'prerevolutionary' situation."

Revolutionary students feared the power of the United States—particularly its Central Intelligence Agency to overthrow a new Iranian government. One source of this concern was a book by CIA agent Kermit Roosevelt Jr. titled Countercoup: The Struggle for Control of Iran. Many students had read excerpts from the book and thought that the CIA would attempt to implement this countercoup strategy.

Khomeini, who referred to America as the "Great Satan", instantly got rid of the Shah's prime minister and replaced him with a moderate politician called Mehdi Bazargan. Until this point, the Carter Administration was still hoping for normal relationships with Iran, sending its National Security Adviser Zbigniew Brzezinski.

The Islamic revolutionaries wished to extradite and execute the ousted Shah, and Carter refused to give him any further support or help return him to power. The Shah, suffering from terminal cancer, requested entry into the United States for treatment. The American embassy in Tehran opposed the request, as they were intent on stabilizing relations between the new interim revolutionary government of Iran and the United States. However, President Carter agreed to let the Shah in, after severe pressure from Henry Kissinger, Nelson Rockefeller and other pro-Shah political figures. Iranians' suspicion that the Shah was actually trying to conspire against the Iranian Revolution grew; thus, this incident was often used by the Iranian revolutionaries to justify their claims that the former monarch was an American puppet, and this led to the storming of the American embassy by radical students allied with the Khomeini faction.

The hostage crisis 

On 4 November 1979, the revolutionary group Muslim Student Followers of the Imam's Line, angered that the Shah had been allowed into the United States, occupied the American embassy in Tehran and took American diplomats hostage. The 52 American diplomats were held hostage for 444 days. In Iran, the incident was seen by many as a blow against American influence in Iran and the liberal-moderate interim government of Prime Minister Mehdi Bazargan, who opposed the hostage taking, resigned soon after. Some Iranians were concerned that the United States may have been plotting another coup against their country in 1979 from the American embassy. In the United States, the hostage-taking was seen as a violation of a centuries-old principle of international law that granted diplomats immunity from arrest and diplomatic compounds sovereignty in the territory of the host country they occupy.

The United States military attempted a rescue operation, Operation Eagle Claw, on April 24, 1980, which resulted in an aborted mission and the deaths of eight American military men. The crisis ended with the signing of the Algiers Accords in Algeria on January 19, 1981. On January 20, 1981, the date the treaty was signed, the hostages were released. The Iran-United States Claims Tribunal (located in The Hague, Netherlands) was established for the purpose of handling claims of American nationals against Iran and of Iranian nationals against the United States. American contact with Iran through The Hague covers only legal matters. The crisis led to lasting economic and diplomatic damage.

On 7 April 1980, Carter severed diplomatic relations between Iran and the United States and they have been frozen ever since. Since 21 May 1980, Switzerland has been the protecting power for the United States in Iran. Contrary to usual practice, the US Embassy was not given into the charge of the Swiss Embassy. Instead, parts of the embassy complex were turned into an anti-American museum, while other parts became offices for student organizations. Iranian interests in the US were initially represented by the Algerian Embassy. However, Iran later chose Pakistan to be its protecting power in the United States.

Economic consequences of the Iran hostage crisis 

Before the Revolution, the United States was Iran's foremost economic, technical and military partner. This facilitated the modernization of Iran's infrastructure and industry, with as many as 30,000 American expatriates residing in the country in a technical, consulting, or teaching capacity. Some analysts argue that the transformation may have been too rapid, fueling unrest and discontent among an important part of the population in the country and leading to the Revolution in 1979.

After the 1979 seizure of the American Embassy, Carter's Executive Order 12170 froze about $12 billion in Iranian assets, including bank deposits, gold and other properties. According to American officials, most of those were released in 1981 as part of the Algiers Accords to release the hostages. Some assets—Iranian officials say $10 billion, but US officials say much less—remain frozen, pending resolution of legal claims arising from the Revolution.

Commercial relations between Iran and the United States are restricted by American sanctions and consist mainly of Iranian purchases of food, spare parts, and medical products as well as American purchases of carpets and food. Sanctions originally imposed in 1995 by President Bill Clinton were renewed by President Bush, who cited the "unusual and extraordinary threat" to American national security posed by Iran. The 1995 executive orders prohibit American companies and their foreign subsidiaries from conducting business with Iran, while banning any "contract for the financing of the development of petroleum resources located in Iran". In addition, the Iran and Libya Sanctions Act of 1996 (ILSA) imposed mandatory and discretionary sanctions on non-American companies investing more than $20 million annually in the Iranian oil and natural gas sectors.

The ILSA was renewed for five more years in 2001. Congressional bills signed in 2006 extended and added provisions to the act; on September 30, 2006, the act was renamed the Iran Sanctions Act (ISA), as it no longer applied to Libya, and extended several times. On December 1, 2016, ISA was extended for a further ten years.

1981–1989: Reagan administration

Iran–Iraq War 

American intelligence and logistical support played a crucial role in arming Iraq in the Iran–Iraq War. However, Bob Woodward states that the United States gave information to both sides, hoping "to engineer a stalemate". In search for a new set or order in this region, Washington adopted a policy designed to contain both sides economically and militarily. During the second half of the Iran–Iraq War, the Reagan Administration pursued several sanction bills against Iran; on the other hand, it established full diplomatic relations with Saddam Hussein's Ba'athist government in Iraq by removing it from the US list of State Sponsors of Terrorism in 1984. According to the U.S. Senate Banking Committee, the administrations of Presidents Reagan and George H. W. Bush authorized the sale to Iraq of numerous dual-use items, including poisonous chemicals and deadly biological viruses, such as anthrax and bubonic plague. The Iran–Iraq War ended with both agreeing to a ceasefire in 1988. In 2000, US Secretary of State Madeleine Albright expressed regret for that support.

1983: Hezbollah bombings 

The United States contends that Hezbollah, a Shi'ite Islamist organization and client of Iran, has been involved in several anti-American terrorist attacks, including the April 1983 United States Embassy bombing which killed 17 Americans, the 1983 Beirut barracks bombing which killed 241 US Marines in Lebanon, and the 1996 Khobar Towers bombing in Saudi Arabia. An American federal judge ruled in 2003 that the April 1983 United States Embassy bombing was carried out with Iranian support.

United States District Court Judge Royce C. Lamberth declared that the Islamic Republic of Iran was responsible for the 1983 attack in a 2003 case brought by the victims' families. Lamberth concluded that Hezbollah was formed under the auspices of the Iranian government, was completely reliant on Iran in 1983, and assisted Iranian Ministry of Information and Security agents in carrying out the operation. An American federal court has also found that the Khobar Towers bombing was authorized by Ali Khamenei, then ayatollah of Iran.

1983: Anti-communist purge 
According to the Tower Commission report:
In 1983, the U.S. helped bring to the attention of Tehran the threat inherent in the extensive infiltration of the government by the communist Tudeh Party and Soviet or pro-Soviet cadres in the country. Using this information, the Khomeini government took measures, including mass executions, that virtually eliminated the pro-Soviet infrastructure in Iran.

Iran-Contra Affair 

To evade Congressional rules regarding an arms embargo, officials of President Ronald Reagan's administration arranged in the mid-1980s to sell armaments to Iran in an attempt to improve relations with Iran and obtain their influence in the release of hostages held in Lebanon. Oliver North of the National Security Council then diverted proceeds from the arms sale to fund Contra rebels attempting to overthrow the left wing government of Nicaragua, which circumvented the Boland Amendment—the Boland rule applied only to officially appropriated funds. In November 1986, Reagan issued a televised statement that the arms sales did not occur. One week later, he confirmed that weapons had been transferred to Iran, but denied that they were part of an exchange for hostages. Later investigations by Congress and an independent counsel disclosed details of both operations and noted that documents relating to the affair were destroyed or withheld from investigators by Reagan administration officials.

United States attack of 1988 

In 1988, the United States launched Operation Praying Mantis against Iran, claiming that it was retaliation for the Iranian mining of areas of the Persian Gulf as part of the Iran–Iraq War. The American attack was the largest American naval combat operation since World War II. American action began with coordinated strikes by two surface groups that neutralized the Sassan oil platform and the Sirri oil platform of Iran. Iran lost one major warship and a smaller gunboat. Damage to the oil platforms was eventually repaired. Iran sued for reparations at the International Court of Justice, stating that the United States breached the 1955 Treaty of Amity. The court dismissed the claim but noted that "the actions of the United States of America against Iranian oil platforms on October 19, 1987 (Operation Nimble Archer) and April 18, 1988 (Operation Praying Mantis) cannot be justified as measures necessary to protect the essential security interests of the United States of America." The American attack helped pressure Iran to agree to a ceasefire with Iraq later that summer.

1988: Iran Air Flight 655 

On July 3, 1988, near the end of the Iran–Iraq War, the US Navy guided missile cruiser USS Vincennes shot down an Iranian Airbus A300B2, which was on a scheduled commercial flight in Iranian airspace over the Strait of Hormuz. The attack killed 290 civilians from six nations, including 66 children. USS Vincennes was in the Persian Gulf as part of Operation Earnest Will. The United States initially contended that flight 655 was a warplane and then said that it was outside the civilian air corridor and did not respond to radio calls. Both statements were untrue, and the radio calls were made on military frequencies to which the airliner did not have access. According to the Iranian government, the attack was an intentional and unlawful act. Iran refused to accept the idea of mistaken identification, arguing that this constituted gross negligence and recklessness amounting to an international crime, because the aircraft was not on a trajectory that threatened the Vincennes and had not aimed radar at it. The United States has expressed regret for the loss of innocent life but has not apologized to the Iranian government.

The men of the Vincennes were all awarded Combat Action Ribbons for completion of their tours in a combat zone. Lustig, the air-warfare coordinator, received the Navy Commendation Medal, often given for acts of heroism or meritorious service, but a not-uncommon end-of-tour medal for a second tour division officer. According to the History Channel, the medal citation noted his ability to "quickly and precisely complete the firing procedure." However, in 1990, The Washington Post listed Lustig's awards as one being for his entire tour from 1984 to 1988 and the other for his actions relating to the surface engagement with Iranian gunboats. In 1990, Rogers was awarded the Legion of Merit "for exceptionally meritorious conduct in the performance of outstanding service as commanding officer ... from April 1987 to May 1989." The award was given for his service as the Commanding Officer of the Vincennes, and the citation made no mention of the downing of Iran Air 655.

1989–1993: Bush administration 
Newly elected U.S. president George H. W. Bush announced a "goodwill begets goodwill" gesture in his inaugural speech on 20 January 1989. The Bush administration urged Rafsanjani to use Iran's clout in Lebanon to obtain the release of the remaining US hostages held by Hezbollah. Bush indicated there would be a reciprocal gesture toward Iran by the United States. Bush's national security advisor Brent Scowcroft said in late 1991 it might be possible to take Iran off the terrorist list, reduce economic sanctions, and further compensate Iranians for the shooting down of an Iranian civilian Airbus jet with a missile launched by a United States ship in July 1988, by mistake. However, the Bush administration did not respond to Iran's gesture, even after the last hostage, reporter Terry Anderson, was finally released in December 1991.

1993–2001: Clinton administration 

In April 1995, a total embargo on dealings with Iran by American companies was imposed by President Bill Clinton. This ended trade, which had been growing following the end of the Iran–Iraq War. The next year, the American Congress passed the Iran-Libya Sanctions act, designed to prevent other countries from making large investments in Iranian energy. The act was denounced by the European Union as invalid, but it blocked some investment for Iran.

Khatami and Iranian reformers 
In January 1998, newly elected Iranian President Mohammad Khatami called for a "dialogue of civilizations" with the United States in a CNN interview. In the interview, Khatami invoked Alexis de Tocqueville's Democracy in America to explain the similarities between American and Iranian quests for freedom. American Secretary of State Madeleine Albright responded positively, and the countries exchanged wrestling teams. This also brought free travel between the countries as well as an end to the American embargo of Iranian carpets and pistachios. Relations then stalled due to opposition from Iranian conservatives and American preconditions for discussions, including changes in Iranian policy on Israel, nuclear energy, and support for terrorism.

Inter-Parliamentary (Congress-to-Majlis) informal talks 
On August 31, 2000, four United States Congress members, Senator Arlen Specter, Representative Bob Ney, Representative Gary Ackerman, and Representative Eliot L. Engel held informal talks in New York City with several Iranian leaders. The Iranians included Mehdi Karroubi, speaker of the Majlis of Iran (Iranian Parliament); Maurice Motamed, a Jewish member of the Majlis; and three other Iranian parliamentarians.

2001–05: Bush administration, first term

September 11 attacks 
On September 25, 2001, Iran's president Mohammad Khatami meeting British Foreign Secretary, Jack Straw, said: "Iran fully understands the feelings of the Americans about the terrorist attacks in New York and Washington on September 11." He said although the American administrations had been at best indifferent about terrorist operations in Iran (since 1979), the Iranians instead felt differently and had expressed their sympathetic feelings with bereaved Americans in the tragic incidents in the two cities. He also stated that "Nations should not be punished in place of terrorists." According to Radio Farda's website, when the attacks' news was released, some Iranian citizens gathered in front of the Embassy of Switzerland in Tehran, which serves as the protecting power of the United States in Iran (US interests protecting office in Iran), to express their sympathy and some of them lit candles as a symbol of mourning. This piece of news at Radio Farda's website also states that in 2011, on the anniversary of the attacks, United States Department of State, published a post at its blog, in which the Department thanked Iranian people for their sympathy and stated that they would never forget Iranian people's kindness on those harsh days. The attacks were condemned by both the President and the Supreme Leader of Iran. BBC and Time magazine published reports on holding candlelit vigils for the victims by Iranian citizens at their websites. According to Politico magazine, following the attacks, Sayyed Ali Khamenei, the Supreme Leader of Iran, "suspended the usual "Death to America" chants at Friday prayers" temporarily. The military forces of the United States of America and the Islamic Republic of Iran cooperated with each other to overthrow the Taliban regime which had conflicts with the government of Iran. Iran's Quds Force helped US forces and Afghan rebels in 2001 uprising in Herat.

"Axis of evil" speech 

On January 29, 2002—four months after 9/11, US President Bush gave his "Axis of evil" speech, describing Iran, along with North Korea and Iraq, as an axis of evil and warning that the proliferation of long-range missiles developed by these countries constituted terrorism and threatened the United States. The speech caused outrage in Iran and was condemned by reformists and conservatives.

Since 2003, the United States has been flying unmanned aerial vehicles, launched from Iraq, over Iran to obtain intelligence on Iran's nuclear program, reportedly providing little new information. The Iranian government has described the surveillance as illegal.

Alleged "Grand Bargain" proposal 

On 4 May 2003, the Swiss government sent the U.S. State Department an unsigned one-page memorandum, which was not on official letterhead, and contained a cover letter by Swiss diplomat Tim Guldimann which laid out a roadmap for discussions between Iran and the U.S. Under the heading of "U.S. aims", the document stated that Iran was willing to put "the following aims on the agenda": Accepting "the two-states approach" to the Israeli–Palestinian conflict, ending "material support to Palestinian opposition groups ... from Iranian territory," pressuring Hezbollah "to become an exclusively political and social organization within Lebanon," supporting "political stabilization and the establishment of democratic institutions" in Iraq, taking "decisive action against any terrorists (above all al Qaeda) on Iranian territory," and fully cooperating with the International Atomic Energy Agency (IAEA) to ensure "there are no Iranian endeavors to develop or possess WMD." Under the heading of "Iran aims", the document stated "the U.S. accepts a dialogue ... and agrees that Iran puts the following aims on the agenda": Ending U.S. efforts to change "the political system" in Iran, abolishing "all sanctions," taking action against the People's Mujahedin of Iran (MKO), recognizing "Iran's legitimate security interests in the region," and granting Iran "access to peaceful nuclear technology, biotechnology and chemical technology." In the cover letter, Guldimann claimed that he developed the "Roadmap" with Sadeq Kharrazi, "the Iranian ambassador in Paris," and that Supreme Leader Ali Khamenei "agreed with 85–90% of the paper," although he could not obtain "a precise answer on what exactly the Leader explicitly has agreed." The Bush administration did not respond to the proposal, although in March 2004 President Bush sent Mohamed ElBaradei to Tehran with the message that "an Iranian representative with the authority to make a deal should go to the U.S. and Bush himself would personally lead" negotiations to "resolve all the issues between us;" according to Hassan Rouhani, the Iranian leadership decided "that we should not negotiate with the U.S.," even though "the Americans had taken the first step."

Nevertheless, in 2007, The New York Times columnist Nicholas Kristof and others popularized the notion that "hard-liners in the Bush administration killed discussion" of an Iranian "Grand Bargain" that "could have saved lives in Iraq, isolated Palestinian terrorists and encouraged civil society groups in Iran," with Kristof concluding: "The record indicates that officials from the repressive, duplicitous government of Iran pursued peace more energetically and diplomatically than senior Bush administration officials—which makes me ache for my country." Kristof claimed "Iran also sent its own master text of the proposal to the State Department and, through an intermediary, to the White House." However, available evidence casts doubt on the genuineness of this proposal, which may have merely been an invention of Guldimann, who sought to promote U.S.–Iran rapprochement. For example, Michael Rubin noted that "Guldimann told different people different things about the document's origin," while "the Swiss Foreign Ministry refused to back up Guldimann's account." Iranian and U.S. officials were engaged in a series of secret, high-level negotiations during 2003, and Iran's UN ambassador Mohammad Javad Zarif had met with U.S. diplomat Zalmay Khalilzad on May 3–one day prior to the State Department receiving the alleged "Grand Bargain." Glenn Kessler asked "If Iran was serious, why would such an important diplomatic undertaking be transmitted in such a haphazard way through the Swiss ambassador when one of the supposed co-authors was already holding senior-level talks with U.S. officials?" Similarly, Rubin declared: "Guldimann's ignorance of these ongoing discussions exposed his fraud." Former Deputy Secretary of State Richard Armitage recounted that U.S. officials "couldn't determine what was the Iranians' and what was the Swiss ambassador's" and "nothing that we were seeing in this fax was in consonance with what we were hearing face to face," former National Security Adviser Stephen J. Hadley called the "Grand Bargain" "the result of freelancing by a Swiss diplomat hoping to be the one to make peace between Iran and the United States," and a State Department spokesman described the document as "a creative exercise on the part of the Swiss ambassador." In a 30 March 2006 email to Trita Parsi, Zarif confessed: "The claims and counter claims about the source of the proposals and motivations of intermediaries remain a mystery for me. What I think is important is the fact that Iran was prepared."

2003: Border incursions begin 
Several claims have been made that the US has violated Iranian territorial sovereignty since 2003, including drones, soldiers, and the Party for a Free Life in Kurdistan (PEJAK). An American RQ-7 Shadow and a Hermes UAV have crashed in Iran. Seymour Hersh stated that the United States has also been penetrating eastern Iran from Afghanistan in a hunt for underground installations developing nuclear weapons.

2005–09: Bush administration, second term 
In August 2005, Mahmoud Ahmadinejad became Iran's president. On 8 May 2006, he sent a personal letter to President Bush to propose "new ways" to end Iran's nuclear dispute. US Secretary of State Condoleezza Rice and National Security Adviser Stephen Hadley both dismissed it as a negotiating ploy and publicity stunt that did not address American concerns about Iran's nuclear program. Ahmadinejad later said that "the letter was an invitation to monotheism and justice, which are common to all divine prophets".

Bush insisted in August 2006 that "there must be consequences" for Iran's continued enrichment of uranium. He said that "the world now faces a grave threat from the radical regime in Iran." Ahmadinejad invited Bush to a debate at the UN General Assembly, which was to take place on September 18, 2006. The debate was to be about Iran's right to enrich uranium. The invitation was promptly rejected by White House spokesman Tony Snow, who said "There's not going to be a steel-cage grudge match between the President and Ahmadinejad".

In November 2006, Ahmadinejad wrote an open letter to the American people, stating that dialogue was urgently needed because of American activities in the Middle East and that the United States was concealing the truth about relations.

In September 2007, Ahmadinejad addressed the UN General Assembly. Prior to this, he gave a speech at Columbia University, where university president Lee Bollinger used his introduction to portray the Iranian leader as "astonishingly uneducated" about the Holocaust and having the policies of a "cruel and petty dictator". Ahmadinejad answered a query about the treatment of gays in Iran by saying: "We don't have homosexuals like in your country. We don't have that in our country. We don't have this phenomenon; I don't know who's told you we have it". An aide later stated that he was misrepresented and was actually saying that "compared to American society, we don't have many homosexuals". Ahmadinejad was not permitted to lay a wreath at the World Trade Center site. He stated, "Many innocent people were killed there. Some of those people were American citizens, obviously ... We obviously are very much against any terrorist action and any killing. And also we are very much against any plots to sow the seeds of discord among nations. Usually, you go to these sites to pay your respects. And also to perhaps to air your views about the root causes of such incidents." When told that Americans believed that Iran exported terrorism and would be offended by the "photo op", he replied, "Well, I'm amazed. How can you speak for the whole of the American nation? ... You are representing a media and you're a reporter. The American nation is made up of 300 million people. There are different points of view over there".

In an April 2008 speech, Ahmadinejad described the September 11 attacks as a "suspect event", saying that all that happened was that "a building collapsed". He stated that the death toll was never published, that the victims' names were never published, and that the attacks were used subsequently as pretext for the invasions of Afghanistan and Iraq. That October, he expressed happiness about the 2008 global economic crisis and what he called "collapse of liberalism". He said the West has been driven to a dead-end and that Iran was proud "to put an end to liberal economy". The previous month, he had told the UN General Assembly, "The American empire in the world is reaching the end of its road, and its next rulers must limit their interference to their own borders".

Iran's nuclear program 

Since 2003, the United States had alleged that Iran had a program to develop nuclear weapons. Iran maintained that its nuclear program was aimed only at generating electricity. The United States' position was that "a nuclear-armed Iran is not acceptable", but officials have denied that the United States is preparing for an imminent strike. The United Kingdom, France and Germany have also attempted to negotiate a cessation of nuclear enrichment activities by Iran.

In June 2005, Condoleezza Rice said that International Atomic Energy Agency (IAEA) head Mohamed El Baradei should either "toughen his stance on Iran" or not be chosen for a third term as IAEA head.
Both the United States and Iran are parties to the Nuclear Non-Proliferation Treaty (NPT). The United States and other countries were alleged during the May 2005 NPT meeting to be in violation of the NPT through Article VI, which requires them to disarm. The IAEA has stated that Iran is in violation of a Safeguards Agreement related to the NPT, due to insufficient reporting of nuclear material, its processing and its use. Under Article IV, the treaty gives non-nuclear states the right to develop civilian nuclear energy programs. From 2003 to early 2006, tensions mounted between the United States and Iran while IAEA inspections of sensitive nuclear industry sites in Iran continued.

In March 2006, American and European representatives noted that Iran had enough unenriched uranium hexafluoride gas to make ten atomic bombs, adding that it was "time for the Security Council to act". The unenriched uranium cannot be used either in the Bushehr reactor, which is a pressurized water reactor, nor in atomic bombs, unless it becomes enriched.

Iran fears of attack by the US 
In 2006, the United States passed the Iran Freedom and Support Act, which appropriated millions of dollars for human rights non-governmental organizations (NGOs) working in Iran. Several politicians in both countries have claimed the Act is a "stepping stone to war", although the Act prohibits the use of force against Iran.

In May 2007, Iran's top diplomat Foreign Minister Manouchehr Mottaki stated that Iran is "ready to talk" to the United States. That month, Iran announced willingness, under certain conditions, to improve its relations with the United States despite having passed up the opportunity for direct talks at the Iraq conference in Sharm El-Sheikh on May 3, 2007. The conference had been seen by the Americans as an opportunity to get closer to the Iranians and exchange gestures in a public forum.

US covert operations inside Iran 

In March 2006, the Party for a Free Life in Kurdistan (PEJAK), an opposition group closely linked to the Kurdistan Workers Party (PKK) killed 24 members of the Iranian security forces. The PEJAK is linked to the Kurdistan Workers Party (PKK), which is listed by the US State Department as a Foreign Terrorist Organization. Dennis Kucinich stated in an April 18, 2006, letter to Bush that PEJAK was supported and coordinated by the United States, since it is based in Iraq, which is under the de facto control of American military forces. In November 2006, journalist Seymour Hersh in The New Yorker supported this claim, stating that the American military and the Israelis are giving the group equipment, training, and targeting information in order to create internal pressures in Iran.

On April 3, 2007, the American Broadcasting Company (ABC) stated that the United States had supported Jundullah since 2005. The Washington Times has described Jundullah as a militant Islamic organization based in Waziristan, Pakistan, and affiliated with Al-Qaeda that has claimed to kill approximately 400 Iranian soldiers.

The United States has escalated its covert operations against Iran, according to current and former military, intelligence, and congressional sources. They state that Bush sought up to $400 million for these military operations, which were described in a secret Presidential Finding and are designed to destabilize Iran's religious leadership. The covert activities involve support of the minority Ahwazi Arab and Baluchi groups and other dissident organizations. United States Special Operations Forces have been conducting cross-border operations from southern Iraq, with Presidential authorization, since 2007. The scale and the scope of the operations in Iran, which involve the CIA and the Joint Special Operations Command (JSOC), have been significantly expanded in 2008.

Iraqi insurgency 
Iran has been accused by the United States of giving weapons and support to the Iraqi insurgency (which includes the terrorist group al-Qaeda). The United States State Department states that weapons are smuggled into Iraq and used to arm Iran's allies among the Shiite militias, including those of the anti-American cleric Muqtada al-Sadr and his Mahdi army. Evidence for this is that weapons, including mortars, rockets and munitions bear Iranian markings. US commanders report that these bombs inflicted 30 percent of all American military casualties in Iraq excluding Al Anbar Governorate, where these weapons have not been found. Furthermore, US intelligence has obtained satellite photographs of three training camps for Iraqi insurgents near Iran's capital where they are allegedly trained guerilla tactics, kidnapping and assassination.

U.S. Director of National Intelligence Michael McConnell stated in an interview with the Council on Foreign Relations that there was overwhelming evidence that Iran was arming the insurgency in Iraq. During his address to the United States Congress on September 11, 2007, Commanding officer for the United States forces in Iraq, General David Petraeus noted that the multinational forces in Iraq have found that Iran's Quds force has provided training, equipment, funding, and direction to terrorists. "When we captured the leaders of these so-called special groups ... and the deputy commander of a Lebanese Hezbollah department that was created to support their efforts in Iraq, we've learned a great deal about how Iran has, in fact, supported these elements and how those elements have carried out violent acts against our forces, Iraqi forces and innocent civilians."

In 2014, the United States and Iran began unofficial limited cooperation in the fight against the terrorist organization Islamic State in Iraq and the Levant (ISIL).

2006 sanctions against Iranian institutions 

Pushing for international sanctions against Iran because of its nuclear program, the United States accused Iran of providing logistical and financial support to Shi'a militias in Iraq. Iran denied this claim. The American government imposed sanctions on an Iranian bank on September 8, 2006, barring it from direct or indirect dealings with American financial institutions. The move against Bank Saderat Iran was announced by the undersecretary for treasury, who accused the bank of transferring funds for terrorist groups, including $50,000,000 to Hezbollah. While Iranian financial institutions are barred from directly accessing the American financial system, they are permitted to do so indirectly through banks in other countries. He said the United States government would also persuade European financial institutions not to deal with Iran.

2007 US raids Iran Consulate General 
In 2007, US forces raided the Iranian Consulate General located in Erbil, Iraq and arrested five staff members. It was said that American forces landed their helicopters around the building, broke through the consulate's gate, disarmed the guards, confiscated documents, arrested five staff members, and left for an undisclosed location. People living in the neighborhood were told they could not leave their homes. Three people who left their homes were arrested, and a wife of one of these men confirmed her husband's arrest.

Russian Minister of Foreign Affairs Mikhail Kamynin said that the raid was an unacceptable violation of the Vienna Convention on Consular Relations. The Kurdistan Regional Government also expressed their disapproval.

At a hearing in Iraq on January 11, 2007, United States Senator Joseph Biden, chairman of the Senate Foreign Relations Committee, told Rice that the Bush Administration did not have the authority to send American troops on cross-border raids. Biden said, "I believe the present authorization granted the president to use force in Iraq does not cover that, and he does need congressional authority to do that. I just want to set that marker". Biden sent a follow-up letter to the White House asking for an explanation on the matter.

The same day, Iran's foreign ministry sent a letter to Iraq's foreign ministry, asking Iraq to stop the United States from interfering with Iran–Iraq relations. The official said, "We expect the Iraqi government to take immediate measures to set the aforesaid individuals free and to condemn the US troopers for the measure. Following up on the case and releasing the arrestees is a responsibility of primarily the Iraqi government and then the local government and officials of the Iraqi Kurdistan".

On November 9, American forces released two Iranian diplomats after 305 days, as well as seven other Iranian citizens. The officials were captured in the raid, and the others had been picked up in different parts of the country and held for periods ranging from three months to three years. American officials said, "The release followed a careful review of individual records to determine if they posed a security threat to Iraq, and if their detention was of continued intelligence value". American forces still hold 11 Iranian diplomats and citizens.

2008 naval dispute 

In January 2008, American officials accused Iran of harassing and provoking their naval vessels in the Strait of Hormuz, but Iran denied the claim. The United States presented audio and video footage of the incident, which included threats made to the Americans. Iranians have told The Washington Post that the accent in the recording does not sound Iranian. Iran has accused the United States of creating a "media fuss" and has released its own abridged video recording of the incident, which does not contain threats. There has been significant confusion as to the source of the threatening radio transmissions. According to the newspaper Navy Times, the incident could have been caused by a locally famous heckler known as the "Filipino Monkey".

Covert action against Iran 

In 2008, New Yorker reporter Seymour Hersh detailed American covert action plans against Iran involving the CIA, Defense Intelligence Agency (DIA), and Special Forces. Journalist David Ignatius of The Washington Post asserted that American covert action "appears to focus on political action and the collection of intelligence rather than on lethal operations". Iranian commentator Ali Eftagh stated that the covert actions are being made public by the American government as a form of psychological warfare.

Other events (2007–08)
A meeting in Baghdad between Iranian and American diplomats was "the first formal direct contact after decades during which neither country has been willing to talk to the other." Asia Times commentator Kaveh L Afrasiabi noted that success in United States-Iran nuclear negotiations depends on Iranian perception of American respect.

A former Iranian diplomat, Nosratollah Tajik, was arrested in the UK and accused by the United States of smuggling arms. He initially appeared in court on April 19, 2007, fighting extradition to the US. The case is still ongoing.

In January 2009, The New York Times reported that the United States had rejected a 2008 appeal from Israel to attack Iran's main nuclear complex.

2008 US veto of Israeli strikes on Iranian nuclear facilities 
In September 2008, The Guardian reported that the US vetoed Israeli prime minister Ehud Olmert's plan to bomb Iranian nuclear facilities the previous May.

2009–17: Obama administration 

Two days after Barack Obama was elected president in November 2008, Ahmadinejad issued the first congratulatory message to a newly elected American president since 1979: "Iran welcomes basic and fair changes in U.S. policies and conducts. I hope you will prefer real public interests and justice to the never-ending demands of a selfish minority and seize the opportunity to serve people so that you will be remembered with high esteem".

In his inaugural speech, President Obama said:
To the Muslim world, we seek a new way forward, based on mutual interest and mutual respect. To those leaders around the globe who seek to sow conflict, or blame their society's ills on the West—know that your people will judge you on what you can build, not what you destroy. To those who cling to power through corruption and deceit and the silencing of dissent, know that you are on the wrong side of history; but that we will extend a hand if you are willing to unclench your fist.

Ahmadinejad issued a list of grievances, including the 1953 coup, support for Saddam Hussein in the Iran–Iraq War, and the Iran Air Flight 655 incident. In March 2009, an official delegation of Hollywood actors and filmmakers met with their Iranian counterparts in Tehran as a symbol of United States–Iran relations, but Javad Shamghadri, the Arts Adviser to Ahmadinejad, rejected it and said, "Representatives of Iran's film industry should only have an official meeting with representatives of the academy and Hollywood if they apologize for the insults and accusations against the Iranian nation during the past 30 years".

On 19 March 2009, the beginning of the festival of Nowruz, Obama spoke directly to the Iranian people in a video saying, "The United States wants the Islamic Republic of Iran to take its rightful place in the community of nations. You have that right—but it comes with real responsibilities".

Roxana Saberi and detained diplomats 
In April 2009, Iranian-American journalist Roxana Saberi was sentenced to eight years in prison after being convicted of spying for the United States. She was accused of possessing a classified document but denied the charge. After spending four months in prison, she was released in May, and the charge was dropped.

On July 9, 2009, the United States released five Iranian diplomats (Mohsen Bagheri, Mahmoud Farhadi, Majid Ghaemi, Majid Dagheri and Abbas Jami), who had been held since January 2007. Some analysts believe this was a part of hostage exchange deal between the countries. The US State Department said the release was not part of a deal with Iran but was necessary under an American-Iraqi security pact.

Kaveh Lotfolah Afrasiabi was arrested in early 2021 by the FBI and charged with "acting and conspiring to act as an unregistered agent of Iran". According to federal authorities, Afrasiabi is accused of lobbying and working secretively for the Iranian government.

Iranian presidential elections 2009 

On 12 June 2009, Obama said of the Iranian presidential election: "We are excited to see what appears to be a robust debate taking place in Iran". Ahmadinejad's landslide win, which led to fraud allegations and widespread protests, received little comment from the United States. White House press secretary Robert Gibbs stated, "Like the rest of the world, we were impressed by the vigorous debate and enthusiasm that this election generated, particularly among young Iranians. We continue to monitor the entire situation closely, including reports of irregularities". Vice President Joe Biden said, "It sure looks like the way they're suppressing speech, the way they're suppressing crowds, the way in which people are being treated, that there's some real doubt". On 15 June, State Department spokesman Ian Kelly declared that the US was "deeply troubled by the reports of violent arrests and possible voting irregularities".

Detention of US hikers over Iraqi border
Three American hikers were arrested on 31 July 2009, in Iran after they crossed into Iranian territory. Reports say the hikers accidentally crossed into Iran while hiking between Halabja and Ahmad Awa in the Kurdish Region of Iraq.

Disappearance of Shahram Amiri 
Iranian nuclear scientist Shahram Amiri disappeared in May 2009, and Iran accused the United States of abducting him. On 13 July 2010, the BBC reported that Amiri had taken refuge in the Iranian interests section of Pakistani Embassy in Washington, DC, and sought help to reach Iran. However, after his return to Iran, he was sentenced to ten years in prison and in August 2016 was reported to have been executed for treason.

Drone incidents 

On 4 December 2011, an American Lockheed Martin RQ-170 Sentinel UAV operated by the CIA was captured by Iranian forces near the city of Kashmar. Iran claimed the drone was not only flying in sovereign airspace, but was commandeered by its cyber warfare unit and safely brought to the ground. The US initially claimed the drone had malfunctioned and crashed in Iranian airspace, only to later admit the drone was intact anonymously when footage was shown on Iranian television.

In November 2012, an Iranian Su-25 fighter jet fired on a similar MQ-1 over international waters. In November 2012, two Iranian Su-25s fired on a US drone over the Persian Gulf. The Su-25s fired at least two bursts of cannon fire, and after the drone began moving away, the Iranian aircraft chased it and did aerial loops around it before breaking off and returning to base. On 12 March 2013, an Iranian F-4 fighter jet began pursuing a US MQ-1 over international waters. The F-4 was warned against coming closer by two US fighter jets, at which point it broke off.

Threats to close Persian Gulf 
In late December 2011, Iranian navy chief Admiral Habibollah Sayyari was reported to have said that it would be "very easy" for Iran to close the Straits of Hormuz.

On 3 January 2012 Iran's army chief Ataollah Salehi warned "We recommend to the American warship that passed through the Strait of Hormuz and went to Gulf of Oman not to return to the Persian Gulf". However, this was later denied by the Defense Minister of Iran. The warship is believed to be the American aircraft carrier  which recently vacated the area as Iran conducted a 10-day naval exercise near the Strait of Hormuz. Salehi was also quoted as saying "We have no plan to begin any irrational act but we are ready against any threat." The US Navy responded that it will continue with its regularly scheduled deployments, in accordance with international maritime conventions.

In 2012, the United States Navy was warned that Iran was preparing suicide attack boats and was building up its naval forces in the Gulf region. At a briefing in Bahrain, Vice Admiral Mark Fox told reporters the US Navy's Fifth Fleet could prevent Iran from blocking the Strait of Hormuz.

The actual ability of Iran to close the strait has been questioned by experts, with estimates of the time that Iran would be able to sustain the closure ranging from a few days to over a hundred days.

Attempts at rapprochement 

The visit by Iran's President Hassan Rouhani, viewed in the West as a moderate figure, to New York City to address the United Nations General Assembly in September 2013, shortly after he assumed office, was hailed as progress in the countries′ relationship. His television interviews and public addresses while in the U.S. were seen as an effort to convey the message Iran posed no threat and that he was ready to do business with the West; the Obama administration had in turn made a symbolic gesture by making the first official U.S. acknowledgement of the CIA's role in the ousting of Iran's democratically elected government of Mohammad Mosaddegh. However, he rejected US President Barack Obama's request for a meeting with him. On 26 September, Iran and the U.S. held their first substantive high-level meeting since the 1979 revolution at multilateral talks that involved the U.S. secretary of state, John Kerry, and the Iranian foreign minister, Mohammad Javad Zarif, the meeting being chaired by the EU foreign policy chief, Catherine Ashton. The following day, Rouhani and Obama spoke by telephone, the two countries' highest political exchange since 1979. The call led to protests by Iranian conservatives who chanted "death to America" when Rouhani returned to Tehran. On the 34th anniversary of the embassy siege, tens of thousands of supporters of a more hardline approach to relations gathered at the site of the former US embassy to denounce rapprochement. It was the largest such gathering in recent years. Conversely, a majority of Iranian citizens saw the progression of peace talks with the United States as a sign of hope for a future of an alliance between the two nations.

On 28 September 2015, an unplanned and "accidental" encounter between US President Barack Obama and Iranian Minister of Foreign Affairs Javad Zarif occurred on the sidelines of a luncheon at the United Nations General Assembly, with the two men reportedly shaking hands. It was the first handshake between a US president and a top Iranian diplomat since the 1979 Islamic Revolution. US Secretary of State John Kerry, who was present, also introduced Obama to two senior Iranian officials also involved in the JCPOA nuclear negotiations. The exchange was originally reported in Iranian media and was said to have lasted "less than a minute"; it was immediately condemned by conservative Iranian MP Mansour Haghighatpour, a member of the committee on national security and foreign policy, who called for Zarif to publicly apologize.

Iran nuclear deal (JCPOA) 

On 14 July 2015, the Joint Comprehensive Plan of Action (JCPOA, or the Iran deal) was agreed upon between Iran and a group of world powers: the P5+1 (the permanent members of the United Nations Security Council—the United States, the United Kingdom, Russia, France, and China—plus Germany) and the European Union. The Obama administration agreed to lift sanctions on Iran that had devastated their economy for years, in return Iran promised to give up their nuclear capabilities and allow workers from the UN to do facility checks whenever they so please. President Obama urged US Congress to support the nuclear deal reminding politicians that were wary that if the deal fell through, the US would reinstate their sanctions on Iran.

Following the deal, the U.S. supported a UN Security Council resolution that endorsed the JCPOA—the United Nations Security Council Resolution 2231 of 20 July 2015. The resolution welcomed "Iran's reaffirmation in the JCPOA that it will under no circumstances ever seek, develop or acquire any nuclear weapons".

In 2015, The Washington Post claimed that 2 to 1 Americans supported the United States efforts to negotiate with Iran on behalf of their nuclear capabilities. The Washington Post also stated that 59% of Americans favored the lift of sanctions on Iran's economics in return for the power to regulate Iran's nuclear arms. A polling group called YouGov also did a survey before President Trump took office and found that in approximately 44% of Americans thought that the President should honor international agreements signed by past presidents. The Polling Report has reaffirmed the positive polling numbers from using sources ranging from CNN polls to ABC polls and found that the majority of America was in support of the Iran Nuclear Deal in 2015. By 2016 Gallup News reported that the overall public opinion of the US–Iran nuclear deal was at 30% approval and the disapproval was reported to be at 57%, and 14% had no opinion on the deal. Finally, the latest polls show that in October 2017, Lobe Log (polling firm) found that about 45% of Americans were opposed to the Iran nuclear deal. The approval polls found that only 30% of Americans supported the Iran nuclear deal, staying consistent within the last year.

US Supreme Court decision about frozen Iranian assets 

In April 2016, US Supreme Court ruled Iran must pay almost $2bn to victims of 1983 Beirut barracks bombings. In response, Iranian parliament voted a bill that would obligate the government to claim compensation from the United States for its hostile actions against Iran (including 1953 Iranian coup d'état and United States support for Iraq during the Iran–Iraq war). Under the rules of combat, US troops have no clear legal right to sue. But the judge ruled that the troops were on a peacekeeping mission under peacetime rules of engagement. Therefore, survivors and family members could sue Iran under a 1996 law that allows US citizens to take legal action against nations that sponsor terrorism.

2017–21: Trump administration 

Citizens of Iran and several other countries were temporarily banned from entering the United States by the executive order "Protecting the Nation From Foreign Terrorist Entry Into the United States" of 27 January 2017. The United States also does not allow Iranian citizens or those suspected of being Iranian citizens entry into the US, including Iranian passport holders, except for transit. All passengers and crew members of any nationality should ensure they do not have Iranian entry stamps in their passports. There are no direct flights between Iran and the USA so all travel must transit through a third country, and no Iranian aircraft may enter USA airspace.

The Trump administration was seen as having embarked on the path of strengthening an informal coalition with Saudi Arabia, Israel, the United Arab Emirates and other Sunni Gulf states, with a view to rolling back Iran's influence in the region.

While during his campaign Donald Trump had denounced the JCPOA as "the worst deal ever negotiated" and a disaster that could lead to a nuclear holocaust, in April 2017, the Trump administration certified that Iran was in compliance with the JCPOA.

Between January and late July 2017, Twitter had identified and shut down over 7,000 accounts created by Iranian influence operations.

In July 2017, the vast majority of Congressional Democrats and Republicans voted in favor of the Countering America's Adversaries Through Sanctions Act (CAATSA) that grouped together sanctions against Iran, Russia and North Korea. On 2 August 2017, Iranian Deputy Foreign Minister Abbas Araqchi stated that, "In our view the nuclear deal has been violated". In September 2017, speaking to the UN General Assembly, the countries′ presidents exchanged offensive remarks and expressed opposing views on the JCPOA.

In May 2018, Donald Trump decided to pull out of the JCPOA, announcing he would reimpose economic sanctions on Iran effective from 4 November that year. In response, the Iranian president Hassan Rouhani said that if needed he would "begin our industrial enrichment without any limitations". On 5 July, Iran threatened to close off the Strait of Hormuz if U.S. decided to re-impose oil sanctions on Iran following US withdrawal from the JCPOA.

In late July 2018, against the backdrop of a harsh exchange of threats between the presidents of the U.S. and Iran, a large tanker flying a Saudi flag and transporting some 2 million barrels of oil to Egypt was struck in the Bab-el-Mandeb strait near the port of Hodeida by the Houthi rebels in Yemen, believed to be armed and financed by Iran. The incident, which made Saudi Arabia halt oil shipments through the strait, was seen by analysts as greatly escalating tensions. It was reported that the Trump administration was conducting a program to foment various opposition groups in Iran.

On 13 August 2018, Iranian Supreme leader Ayatollah Ali Khamenei banned direct talks with U.S., referring to the failure of the previous ones. "There will be no war, nor will we negotiate with the US" and "Even if we ever—impossible as it is—negotiated with the US, it would never ever be with the current US administration," Khamenei said. He added that the United States never budges on the primary goal they pursue in negotiations, which are normally based on give and take, and "reneges on its own end of the bargain" after the negotiation.
In November 2018, all the sanctions removed in 2015 were re-imposed on Iran by the Trump administration.

In October 2018 the International Court of Justice provisionally ordered the United States to cancel its sanctions against Iran, relying on the 1955 Treaty of Amity. In response, the United States withdrew from the treaty.

On 7 March 2019, Acting U.S. ambassador to the United Nations Jonathan Cohen, in a letter to Secretary-General António Guterres, urged the United Nations to put new sanctions on Iran for its new missile activities.

IRGC and U.S. Armed Forces terrorist designations 
The United States has opposed the activities of the Islamic Revolutionary Guard Corps (IRGC) based on "the group's growing involvement in Iraq and Afghanistan as well as its support for extremists throughout the Middle East". On 8 April 2019, the US Department of State announced its intent to brand the IRGC a Foreign Terrorist Organization (FTO), effective April 15.

The Iranian parliament responded by ratifying a motion designating "all legal and real persons and troops of the United States and its allies operating in the West Asian region" terrorists, calling any aid to them a terrorist act and pressing the government to defuse the threat of IRGC designation through multilateral negotiations with international organizations. The nonbinding resolution cited "the terrorist nature of the United States regime, particularly that part of the American military and security forces and the US Central Command which have been carrying out acts of terrorism in Iraq, Afghanistan, Syria, and Iran in the past quarter-century, and have given overt support to terrorist plans." Soon after, the Supreme National Security Council cited similar concerns in declaring the IRGC designation dangerous and illegal, the United States a "terrorist government" and CENTCOM its primary "terrorist organization".

The IRGC was placed on the FTO list for instigating and supporting insurgencies in Iraq resulting in the death of American soldiers. It allegedly operates through its Quds force in other countries in the region and in conjunction with other terrorist organizations such as Hezbollah.

The US State Department Special Briefing also warned against increasing involvement of the IRGC forces in the Syrian conflict:

On 10 April, Hassan Nasrallah, Secretary General of Hezbollah, addressed the designation in a televised speech from Beirut:

Michael Rubin, a senior research fellow with the American Enterprise Institute, said he feared the IRGC designation "might exculpate the rest of the regime when, in reality, the IRGC's activities cannot be separated from the state leadership of Supreme Leader Khamenei or President Ahmadinejad". The Iranian newspaper Kayhan quoted the commander of Iran's elite Revolutionary Guards as threatening to deal heavier blows against the United States in response to the designation. Mohammad Khatami, former Reforms Front Iranian President hoped to "remind those in the U.S. Congress or elsewhere working for the benefit of the American nation to stand against these measures or the wall between the two countries grow taller and thicker".

This would be the first time that official armed units of sovereign states are included in a list of banned terrorist groups. Kaveh L. Afrasiabi, a former consultant to the UN's program of Dialogue Among Civilizations, stated in Asia Times Online that the move has possible legal implications: "Under international law, it could be challenged as illegal, and untenable, by isolating a branch of the Iranian government for selective targeting. This is contrary to the 1981 Algiers Accords' pledge of non-interference in Iran's internal affairs by the US government". News leaks about the prospective designation worried European governments and private sector firms, which could face prosecution in American courts for working with the IRGC.

In April 2019 the U.S. threatened to sanction countries continuing to buy oil from Iran after an initial six-month waiver announced in November 2018 expired. According to the BBC, U.S. sanctions against Iran "have led to a sharp downturn in Iran's economy, pushing the value of its currency to record lows, quadrupling its annual inflation rate, driving away foreign investors, and triggering protests." In December 2018, Iran's President Hassan Rouhani warned: "If one day they want to prevent the export of Iran's oil, then no oil will be exported from the Persian Gulf."

2019–2020 escalation in tensions 
Tensions between Iran and the United States escalated in May 2019, with the U.S. deploying more military assets to the Persian Gulf region after receiving intelligence reports of an alleged "campaign" by Iran and its "proxies" to threaten U.S. forces and Strait of Hormuz oil shipping. American officials pointed to threats against commercial shipping and potential attacks by militias with Iranian ties on American troops in Iraq while also citing intelligence reports that included photographs of missiles on dhows and other small boats in the Persian Gulf, supposedly put there by Iranian paramilitary forces. The United States feared they could be fired at its Navy.

On 5 May, U.S. national security adviser John Bolton announced that the U.S. was deploying the  Carrier Strike Group and four B-52 bombers to the Middle East to "send a clear and unmistakable message" to Iran following Israeli intelligence reports of an alleged Iranian plot to attack U.S. forces in the region. Bolton said, "The United States is not seeking war with the Iranian regime, but we are fully prepared to respond to any attack." The deployed USS Abraham Lincoln is in the Arabian Sea, outside the Persian Gulf.

On 7 May, U.S. Secretary of State Mike Pompeo made a surprise midnight visit to Baghdad after canceling a meeting with German Chancellor Angela Merkel. Pompeo told Iraqi President Barham Salih and Prime Minister Adel Abdul Mahdi that they had a responsibility to protect Americans in Iraq. On 8 May, an advisor to Ayatollah Khamenei stated Iran was confident the U.S. was both unwilling and unable to start a war with Iran. On the same day, Iran announced that it would reduce its commitment to the JCPOA nuclear deal, which the U.S. pulled out of in May 2018. Iranian President Hassan Rouhani set a 60-day deadline for the EU and world powers to rescue the current deal before it resumed higher uranium enrichment. The United States Air Forces Central Command announced that F-15C Eagle fighter jets were repositioned within the region to "defend U.S. forces and interests in the region." On 10 May, the U.S. deployed the Marine transport ship  and a Patriot SAM battery to the Middle East. The Pentagon said the buildup was in response to "heightened Iranian readiness to conduct offensive operations." On September 10, after the resignation of U.S. national security advisor John Bolton, Iran stated that his resignation will not lead to talks between Washington and Tehran. On September 16, 2019, Iran said that President Hassan Rouhani will not meet with U.S. President Donald Trump at the United Nations, unless sanctions on Iran are lifted.

In August 2020, U.S. intelligence officials assessed that Iran had offered bounties to the Taliban-linked Haqqani network to kill foreign servicemembers, including Americans, in Afghanistan in 2019. U.S. intelligence determined that Iran paid bounties to Taliban insurgents for the 2019 attack on Bagram airport.

May 2019 Gulf of Oman incident and further rise in tensions 

On 12 May, four commercial ships, including two Saudi Aramco oil tankers, were damaged near the port of Fujairah in the Gulf of Oman. The United Arab Emirates claimed the incident was a "sabotage attack", while a United States assessment reportedly blamed Iran or Iranian "proxy" elements for the attack. On 13 May, the U.S. embassy in Baghdad said that U.S. citizens should not travel to Iraq and for those who were already there to keep a low profile. On the same day, the New York Times reported that Acting U.S. Defense Secretary Patrick Shanahan presented a military plan to send as many as 120,000 troops to the Middle East if Iran attacks American forces or makes steps toward developing nuclear weapons. U.S. President Donald Trump later discredited this, saying that he would instead "send a hell of a lot more" than 120,000 troops if necessary.

On 14 May, both Iranian and U.S. officials said they were not seeking war, even as threats and counter-threats continued. Ayatollah Khamenei downplayed the escalation, saying in comments carried on state television that "no war is going to happen," while Mike Pompeo said while on a visit to Russia, "We fundamentally do not seek a war with Iran." On the same day, Houthi rebels in Yemen carried out multiple drone attacks on a Saudi oil pipeline deep in Saudi territory. The U.S. stated that it believed Iran sponsored the attack, though it was unclear if the attack was particularly related to the Iran-U.S. tensions or related to the Yemeni Civil War that began in 2015 and the Saudi Arabian-led intervention there. On 15 May, the U.S. State Department announced that all non-emergency staff had been ordered to leave the U.S. Embassy in Baghdad.

On 19 May, U.S. President Trump warned that in the event of a conflict, it would be "the official end of Iran." Iranian Foreign Minister Mohammad Javad Zarif responded that Trump's "genocidal taunts" won't "end Iran". On the same day, a rocket exploded inside the heavily fortified Green Zone sector of Baghdad, landing less than a mile from the U.S. Embassy. On 24 May, the U.S. deployed 1,500 additional troops to the Persian Gulf region as a "protective" measure against Iran. The deployment included reconnaissance aircraft, fighter jets and engineers; 600 of the troops were given extended deployments, meaning 900 would be fresh troops. U.S. Navy vice admiral and Director of the Joint Staff Michael Gilday said the U.S. had a high degree of confidence that Iran's Revolutionary Guard was responsible for the 12 May explosions on four tankers and that it was Iranian proxies in Iraq that fired rockets into Baghdad's Green Zone.

On 20 May, President Trump said: "We have no indication that anything's happened or will happen" in Iran. On 25 May, Trump, declaring that ongoing tensions with Iran amounted to a national emergency, invoked a rarely used legal loophole to approve the sale of $8 billion worth of weapons to Saudi Arabia. Weapons would also reportedly be sold to the UAE and Jordan. On 28 May, the International Atomic Energy Agency certified that Iran was abiding by the main terms of the JCPOA, although questions were raised on how many advanced centrifuges Iran was allowed to have, as that was only loosely defined in the deal.

On 1 June, President Hassan Rouhani suggested that Iran would be willing to hold talks but asserted that it would not be pressured by sanctions and American military posturing. On 2 June, Mike Pompeo stated that the U.S. was ready for unconditional discussions with Iran on its nuclear program, but affirmed that it will not relent on pressuring Iran until it starts behaving like a "normal country". "We are prepared to engage in a conversation with no pre-conditions. We are ready to sit down," Pompeo said, while also stating that President Trump had always been willing to seek dialogue with Iranian leadership. Iran's foreign ministry responded stating, "The Islamic Republic of Iran does not pay attention to word-play and expression of hidden agenda in new forms. What matters is the change of U.S. general approach and actual behavior toward the Iranian nation," which it said needed "reform". The softening dialogue came amid U.S. military exercises in the Arabian Sea, which saw various aircraft "simulating strike operations"; Yahya Rahim Safavi, top military aide to Ayatollah Khameini, said that U.S. military vessels in the Persian Gulf were within range of Iranian missiles and warned that any clash between the two countries would push oil prices above $100 a barrel.

On 6 June, U.S. Central Command commander Kenneth F. McKenzie Jr. warned that Iran and its "proxy" forces still posed an "imminent" threat to U.S. forces: "I think we're still in the period of what I would call tactical warning...The threat is very real."

June 2019 Gulf of Oman incident 

On 17 June, the U.S. announced the deployment of 1,000 more soldiers to the Middle East after a second incident in the Gulf of Oman that saw two oil tankers catch fire after allegedly being attacked by limpet mines or flying objects. As in the May incident, the U.S. blamed Iranian forces for the attacks.

June 2019 Iranian shoot-down of U.S. drone 

Tensions reached a new high when, on 20 June, the Islamic Revolutionary Guard Corps shot down a U.S. RQ-4A Global Hawk surveillance drone, claiming that the drone violated Iranian airspace. IRGC commander Hossein Salami called the shoot-down a "clear message" to the U.S. while also warning that, though they were not seeking war, Iran was "completely ready" for it. U.S. Central Command later confirmed that the drone was shot down by Iranian surface-to-air missiles but denied that it violated Iranian airspace, calling it an "unprovoked attack" and in international airspace over the Strait of Hormuz. Iran and the United States provided conflicting GPS coordinates for the drone's location, making it unclear whether the drone was within Iran's 12-mile territorial boundary. President Trump called Iran's downing of the drone a "big mistake". The United States requested a June 24 closed-door United Nations Security Council meeting to address the regional tensions with Iran, according to diplomats.

Media outlets such as The New York Times and ABC News reported that Trump had ordered a retaliatory military strike on Iran on 20 June, but withdrew his decision minutes before the operation began. Trump said the next day that he had decided to halt the operation after being told that as many as 150 Iranians would be killed, although some administration officials said Trump had been advised of the potential casualties before he ordered the operation to be prepared. Secretary of State Mike Pompeo and National Security Adviser John Bolton reportedly objected to the reversal.

On June 22, it was reported that President Trump had approved cyber attacks that disabled IRGC computer systems used to control rocket and missile launches the night of the drone-downing. The cyber strikes were handled by U.S. Cyber Command in conjunction with U.S. Central Command. It represented the first offensive show of force since Cyber Command was elevated to a full combatant command in May 2019. Also on June 22, the U.S. Department of Homeland Security issued a warning to U.S. industries that Iran is stepping up cyber attacks of critical industries—particularly oil, gas and other energy sectors—and government agencies, and has the potential to disrupt or destroy systems.

On June 23, Iranian Major general Gholam Ali Rashid warned the U.S. of "uncontrollable" consequences should a conflict breakout. During a speech in Israel, John Bolton said Iran should not "mistake U.S. prudence and discretion for weakness," emphasizing that future military options are not ruled out and that Trump had only "stopped the strike from going forward at this time". Secretary of State Mike Pompeo visited the Persian Gulf region for talks with Saudi Arabia and the UAE in a bid to build a coalition to combat perceived Iranian nuclear and "terror" ambitions. Meanwhile, Iranian President Hassan Rouhani blamed the United States' "interventionist military presence" for the high tensions.

On June 24, Trump announced new sanctions against the Iranian and IRGC leadership, including Supreme Leader Ali Khamenei and his office. U.S. Treasury Secretary Steven Mnuchin said the sanctions will block "billions" in assets and that Iranian Foreign Minister Javad Zarif will also be sanctioned within the week.

In classified briefings, Mike Pompeo and other U.S. State Department and Pentagon officials reportedly advised members of the U.S. Congress on what they described as alarming ties between Iran and al-Qaeda—including giving the terrorist organization safe haven in the country. The New York Times reported that lawmakers were leery of assertions of Iranian links to al-Qaeda, notably due to concerns that the administration may be using specious assertions to build a case for military action against Iran based on the 2001 Authorization for Use of Military Force Against Terrorists—supposed links between Saddam Hussein and al-Qaeda were used as partial justification to invade Iraq in 2003. On June 27, Deputy Assistant Secretary of Defense Michael Mulroy flatly denied that Pentagon officials linked al-Qaeda to Iran during Congressional meetings. "In these briefings, none of the officials mentioned al-Qa'ida or the 2001 Authorization to Use Military Force," Mulroy stated, adding that he and the Defense Intelligence Agency instead "described the historical ties between Iran and the Taliban, and I explained that these ties are widely and publicly known and referenced in articles and books". On June 24, Trump told reporters that he did not need congressional consent for an initial strike on Iran.

On June 25, Iran said that the new U.S. sanctions prompted a "permanent closure" of their diplomatic ties, and the regime refused to negotiate with Washington until the sanctions were lifted. On June 27, Javad Zarif tweeted that sanctions are not an "alternative to war; they ARE war" and argued that Trump's usage of the term "obliteration" against Iran is a reference to genocide, a war crime. He also said that negotiations and threats are "mutually exclusive" and called the concept of a short war with Iran an "illusion".

Following the drone shoot-down, the U.S. continued unabated to deploy military assets to the region. By June 28, the U.S. had deployed nearly a dozen F-22 Raptor fighter jets to Al Udeid Air Base in Qatar—the first-ever deployment of F-22s to the base—to "defend American forces and interests".

July 2019 alleged American jamming of Iranian drone 
Iran's Deputy Foreign Minister Seyed Abbas Araghchi denied any of the country's drones had been brought down. Iran showed footage of the USS Boxer in a move to disprove Donald Trump's claims that the US shot down an Iranian drone in the Gulf.

On 15 September 2019, Iran rejected American accusations of conducting drone attacks on Saudi Arabia's oil fields. Iran also warned that it is ready for a "full-fledged" war.

November 2019 Iran gasoline price protests 

On 15 November 2019, Iranian authorities raised gasoline prices for civilians and imposed strict rationing rules. The 50 per cent price rise from 10,000 to 15,000 riyals per litre led to an outbreak of violent protests across the country. Protesters demanded that President Hassan Rouhani step down. The gasoline price rises were introduced because of deteriorating economic conditions in Iran, which were partly due to the U.S. sanctions. On 19 November 2019, the United States expressed its support for the protesters and condemned the Iranian government. Multiple officials of the Trump administration, including Mike Pompeo and Stephanie Grisham, made statements in support of the Iranians.

US President Donald Trump said, on 3 December 2019, in an interview, while he was in London for a NATO Summit, they are "killing perhaps thousands and thousands of people right now as we speak".

December 2019 Kata'ib Hezbollah – U.S. attacks in Iraq 

On 27 December 2019, a rocket attack on the K1 military base in Iraq, which houses U.S. and Iraqi forces, killed a U.S. civilian contractor and wounded several U.S. and Iraqi service members. U.S. officials stated that there was an involvement of Kata'ib Hezbollah, an Iranian-backed Iraqi Shi'ite militia group.

On 29 December 2019, the U.S. conducted airstrikes against Kata'ib Hezbollah in Iraq and Syria in retaliation for the death of the U.S. contractor. At least 25 Kata'ib Hezbollah fighters were killed and more than 50 wounded.

In response, Iranian-backed militia groups stormed the US Embassy in Baghdad on December 31, 2019. They burned buildings and defaced property. The group of people left the Embassy on January 1, 2020.

Assassination of Qasem Soleimani, Iranian retaliation and Ukraine International Airlines flight 752 shoot-down 

On 3 January 2020, the U.S. assassinated the Iranian General Qasem Soleimani with an airstrike in Iraq. Soleimani was head of the Iranian Revolutionary Guards' Quds Force, and was considered the second most powerful person of Iran behind Iran's Supreme Leader Ayatollah Khamenei. This killing steeply escalated the decades-old tensions between the two countries.

After the U.S. killed Suleimani, US Ambassador to the United Nations Kelly Craft wrote a letter to the UN Security Council in which she said that the act was one of self-defense. At the same time, she wrote in the letter that the US stood "ready to engage without preconditions in serious negotiations with Iran, with the goal of preventing further endangerment of international peace and security or escalation by the Iranian regime."

Khamenei vowed "severe revenge" against the United States. Declaring three days of public mourning for the general's death, Khamenei stated that "harsh retaliation" waited for the U.S. In the aftermath of Soleimani's killing, the U.S. announced to move over 3,000 additional troops to the Middle East from the 82nd Airborne Division as a precautionary measure amid rising threats from Iran.

On the same day, Switzerland said it had conveyed a U.S. diplomatic message to Iran. Iran said that in the note, the United States had called for a "proportional response" to the killing of the Quds Force leader. In turn, Iran summoned the Swiss envoy and stated that the Americans "made a wrong move and are now worried about its consequences".

On January 7, Iran's Parliament unanimously passed a bill naming all branches of the US Armed Forces and employees of The Pentagon "terrorists". The bill states "Any aid to these forces, including military, intelligence, financial, technical, service or logistical, will be considered as cooperation in a terrorist act".

Later, at approximately 5:30 pm (EST), Iran carried out "Operation Martyr Soleimani" launching 12 to 15 missiles to strike multiple US targets located throughout Iraq, including Al-Assad Airbase where about 1,500 soldiers are housed near Erbil. After an assessment of damages, no casualties were reported. Iran later threatened action against other nations, issuing the statement on Iranian state media "We are warning all American allies, who gave their bases to its terrorist army, that any territory that is the starting point of aggressive acts against Iran will be targeted."

In response Donald Trump posted via Twitter "All is well! Missiles launched from Iran at two military bases located in Iraq. Assessment of casualties & damages taking place now. So far, so good! We have the most powerful and well equipped military anywhere in the world, by far! I will be making a statement tomorrow morning."

Very soon after Trump's response, Ukraine International Airlines flight 752 was shot down by the IRGC after being mistaken for a U. S. cruise missile killing all 176 passengers and crew.

Iran issued an arrest warrant for 36 U.S. political and military officials, including President Trump, for their role in the assassination of Qasem Soleimani.

March 11 attack and retaliation 
The Washington officials claimed in mid of March that an Iran-backed militia group attacked the US military base in Iraq, which killed two American soldiers and a British soldier. Later, during the same week, the US military launched a missile strike against Kata'ib Hezbollah in Iraq, which led to the killing of militiamen, a civilian present at the base, along with five Iraqi servicemen. In retaliation, rockets again struck near the Green Zone of the US Embassy in Baghdad.

New exchange of words after Iran's Supreme Leader Speech 
On 17 January 2020, after Iran attacked two U.S. military bases in Iraq, Ayatollah Ali Khamenei reappeared, after eight years, in Tehran Friday Prayer and defended the Islamic Revolutionary Guard Corps (IRGC) and said "... The day that tens of millions in Iran and hundreds of thousands in Iraq and other countries came to the streets to honor the blood of the Quds Force commander, shaping the biggest farewell of the world,” Ayatollah Khamenei said. “Nothing can do that except of the powerful hand of God.” he added "The IRGC's reaction was a military blow, but even beyond, it was a blow to the U.S. image as a superpower."

Donald Trump replied in his tweets, Khamenei "should be very careful with his words!".

COVID-19 pandemic 

Iran's President Hassan Rouhani wrote a public letter to world leaders asking for help on 14 March 2020, saying his country was struggling to fight the outbreak due to lack of access to international markets as a result of the United States sanctions against Iran. Iran's Supreme Leader Ayatollah Ali Khamenei claimed that the virus was genetically targeted at Iranians by the US, and this is why it is seriously affecting Iran. He did not offer any evidence.

U.S. President Donald Trump said he would be willing to provide coronavirus aid, such as ventilators, to Iran to help deal with the COVID-19 pandemic.

Military satellite 
The aircraft flew into orbit on a multi-stage rocket and was launched from the Shahroud missile range in northern Iran. While not a present threat to the United States and other Iranian adversaries, the completion of the Noor-1 mission confirms the technical competency of the nascent Islamic Revolutionary Guard Corps (IRGC).

Though lauded by the Tasnim News Agency as a national "milestone," the Islamic Republic is not inexperienced in space exploration and, particularly, low-earth orbit operations. In both 2009, 2015, and 2017, Iran sent, respectively, the Omid, Fajr, and Simorgh satellites into orbit.

Despite recent setbacks with high-ranking assassinations and pandemic resistance, the 2020 launch sends a clear message to all Middle Eastern and transoceanic powers: Iran continues to make progress in its quest for regional supremacy and advanced domestic and military technology. Mounting pressure in the last decade has U.S. military and political leaders fearful of Iran's capability of creating ballistic-carrying spacecraft. U.S. Sectretary of State Mike Pompeo disapproved of Iran's successful launch, stating that it proves that the space program is “neither peaceful nor entirely civilian," but the Trump administration, supposedly, "never believed this fiction." During a press conference on 22 April, Pompeo said: "“The Iranians have consistently said that these missile programs were disconnected from their military, that these were purely commercial enterprises. I think today's launch proves what we’ve been saying all along here in the United States: The IRGC, a designated terrorist organization, launched a missile today.”

Iran aids Venezuela by sending oil tankers amid US threat 
In May 2020, five Iranian tankers carrying millions of dollars worth of petrol and similar products were sailed to Venezuela, as part of a wider deal between the two US-sanctioned nations amid heightened tensions between Tehran and Washington. The tankers' voyage come after Venezuela's president Nicolás Maduro had already turned to Iran for help flying in chemicals needed at an aging refinery amid a petrol shortage, a symptom of the wider economic and political chaos gripping Latin America's one-time largest oil producer.

The U.S. was seeking to seize Iranian tankers sailing toward Venezuela with oil and gasoline supplied by Iran, the latest attempt to disrupt ever-closer trade ties between the two heavily sanctioned anti-American allies. Reports suggested four US Navy warships were in the Caribbean for a ‘possible confrontation with Iran's tankers’.

Following the US threat, in a letter to United Nations chief António Guterres, Mohammad Javad Zarif warned against “America's movements in deploying its navy to the Caribbean in order to intervene and create disruption in [the] transfer of Iran's fuel to Venezuela”. He said any such action would be “illegal and a form of piracy” adding that the US would be responsible for “the consequences”, according to a foreign ministry statement.

On 25 May 2020, Venezuela celebrated as the first of five Iranian tankers loaded with gasoline docked in the South American country, delivering badly needed fuel to the crisis-stricken nation. Rest of Iranian oil tankers arrived to their destination shortly without any disruption. The gasoline shipments were arriving in defiance of stiff sanctions by the Trump administration against both nations, and they mark a new era in the burgeoning relationship between Venezuela and Iran, which is expanding its footprint in the Western Hemisphere.

Iranian bounty program 
In August 2020, U.S. intelligence officials assessed that Iran offered bounties to the Taliban-linked Haqqani network to kill foreign servicemembers, including Americans, in Afghanistan. U.S. intelligence determined that Iran paid bounties to Taliban insurgents for the 2019 attack on Bagram airport. According to CNN, Donald Trump's administration has "never mentioned Iran's connection to the bombing, an omission current and former officials said was connected to the broader prioritization of the peace agreement and withdrawal from Afghanistan."

2020 United States presidential election and US President-elect Joe Biden 
During the 2020 United States presidential election, Iran, along with China and Russia, was suspected of foreign interference in the election. When asked by moderator Kristen Welker about how intelligence officials recently uncovered evidence of Iranian interference in the election during the 2020 United States presidential debates, Democratic candidate Joe Biden responded that Iran would "pay a price" for interfering in the election.

Following Biden's victory against incumbent Donald Trump, Iran's President Hassan Rouhani said that Biden's administration has a chance to “compensate for previous mistakes”.

US-based 'terrorist' leader arrested by Iran 
On 1 August 2020 Iranian security forces detained US-based Iranian monarchist Jamshid Sharmahd. He was suspected of masterminding the 2008 Shiraz mosque bombing which killed 14 people and wounded 215. Iran claimed Jamshid Sharmahd, the head of pro-monarchy militant group Tondar, "directed armed and terrorist acts in Iran from America". Iran views Tondar (Persian for thunder) also known as the Kingdom Assembly of Iran, as a terrorist organization. The authorities have asserted links between the group and several people in connection to the 2008 bombing.

Assassination of Abu Muhammad al-Masri
On 7 August 2020 Abu Muhammad al-Masri, second-in-command leader of Al-Qaeda, while driving his car in the Pasdaran neighborhood of Tehran, Iran, was shot to death by Israeli agents. On January 12, 2021, Mike Pompeo confirmed his death. although no further proof was given from either side.

2021–present: Biden administration 

Joe Biden's choice for secretary of state, Antony Blinken, told the Senate that he wanted a "longer and stronger" nuclear deal with Iran.  Blinken warned that a new nuclear agreement could address Iran's "destabilising activities" in the region.

In January 2021, Iran repeatedly urged the Biden Administration to lift some sanctions, as the country struggles with the COVID-19 pandemic. Strict financial sanctions imposed by the Trump administration have had a negative effect on regional economies there, as countries such as India are unable to access Iranian goods for their economic survival.

On February 26, 2021, the United States Military carried out a series of airstrikes on Iran-backed militias in Syria, including Kataib Hezbollah. The strikes took place after a militia-organized rocket attack in the Iraqi city of Erbil wounded four American contractors and one soldier.

In April 2021, over 220 US Congress leaders endorsed H 118, "a resolution expressing support for Iranian people's desire for a democratic republic
Resolution also condemns ‘violations of human rights and state- sponsored terrorism’ by Tehran".

U.S. Secretary of State Antony Blinken did not rule out a military intervention to stop Iran from obtaining nuclear weapons.

On March 13, 2022, Iran launched a dozen ballistic missiles toward Iraq's northern city of Erbil, an unprecedented strike on the capital of the autonomous Iraqi Kurdish region that appeared to be aimed at the US and its allies. General Frank McKenzie, the departing CENTCOM head, told the U.S. Senate Armed Services committee that Iraq is where the United States is most vulnerable in the Middle East and where Tehran is focused in regards to the U.S. presence, but is increasingly concerned about the Iranian ballistic missile capabilities, the long-range drones and a growing Iranian arsenal which threaten the region.

On March 24, 2022, Iran's Foreign Minister Hossein Amirabdollahian said that a short-term resurrection of a 2015 nuclear deal between Tehran and international powers is possible if the US shows pragmatism in Vienna negotiations.

On March 25, 2022, White House National Security Adviser Jake Sullivan said that the US is still seeking negotiations with Iran over its nuclear program, but that if diplomacy fails, the US will work with partners to intensify pressure on Iran.

On March 27, 2022, US Secretary of State Antony Blinken said the US would work with Israel to prevent Iran from getting a nuclear weapon, despite the two close friends' disagreements over Iran's nuclear program.

On March 30, 2022, Following missile assaults by alleged Iran-backed proxies against countries in the region, Washington placed sanctions on an Iranian procurement agent and his companies, accusing them of assisting Tehran's ballistic missile program.

On March 31, 2022, Despite assertions to the contrary, the US continues to violate a United Nations resolution that enshrines a 2015 nuclear deal between Iran and world powers, stated the Iranian foreign ministry spokesperson Saeed Khatibzadeh.

On April 4, 2022, an Iranian foreign ministry spokeswoman declared that the United States is to blame for the halt in talks between Tehran and world powers in Vienna aimed at salvaging their 2015 nuclear accord.

On April 9, 2022, Iran announced penalties on 15 more US officials, including former Army Chief of Staff George Casey and former President Donald Trump's attorney Rudy Giuliani, as efforts to resurrect a 2015 nuclear deal have stagnated for months.

On April 9, 2022, Iranian President Ebrahim Raisi said that Tehran would not relinquish its right to develop its nuclear industry for peaceful purposes and that all countries engaging in talks to resurrect the 2015 nuclear agreement should respect this.

On April 10, 2022, Iran's foreign minister, Hossein Amirabdollahian, said that US President Joe Biden should remove some sanctions against Iran to demonstrate his willingness to restart the international nuclear accord with Tehran.

On April 13, 2022, A senior Iranian Guards commander stated that assassinating all American leaders would not be enough to punish the US death of Iran's Revolutionary Guards' top commander, Qassem Soleimani, two years ago.

On April 21, 2022, the US stated that if Iran wants sanctions relief beyond the 2015 Iran nuclear deal - an apparent reference to removing Iran's Revolutionary Guards from a US terrorist list - it must address US concerns beyond the pact.

On April 21, 2022, Despite "frequent proposals" from Washington to relax sanctions and grant other concessions in exchange, Iran will not abandon plans to avenge the execution of Quds Force Commander Qassem Soleimani by the US in 2020, a top Iranian official warned.

On May 4, 2022, the State Department stated that the US is now equally prepared for a situation in which Iran and the US return to mutual compliance on a nuclear deal, as well as a scenario in which there is no agreement.

On June 16, 2022, the US placed sanctions on Chinese and Emirati corporations, as well as a network of Iranian firms that assist in the sale of Iran's petrochemicals.

On June 29, 2022, The EU's ambassador Enrique Mora tweeted that indirect discussions between Tehran and Washington that intended to resolve the standoff over how to save Iran's 2015 nuclear agreement ended in Qatar without the advancement "the EU team as coordinator had hoped-for."

On July 6, 2022, The United States placed sanctions on a network of Chinese, Emirati, and other businesses it accused of assisting in the delivery and sale of Iranian oil and petrochemical products to East Asia.

On July 9, 2022, the Iranian foreign ministry stated that The United States and Israel's preparations for a combined defense pact with Arab nations to confront the threat of Iranian drones and missiles will only exacerbate regional tensions.

On July 14, 2022, Iran stated that the Middle East will not experience stability and peace as long as Washington's primary objective was to maintain "the fake state of Israel's security," Iranian state TV cited Foreign Ministry spokesperson Nasser Kanaani as saying.

On July 16, 2022, Iran announced that it sanctioned 61 additional Americans, including former Secretary of State Mike Pompeo, for supporting an Iranian dissident group.

On March 12, 2023, Iranian Foreign Minister Hossein Amirabdollahian claimed that the agreement for a prisoners swap was made between Iran and the United States for the release of the $7 billion in frozen Iranian oil funds. A White House official said that Amirabdollahian's statement is false. According to the Iranian source,  Qatar and Switzerland have played role in the prisoner exchange talks. Siamak Namazi and Emad Sharghi are among the Americans imprisoned in Iran.

Iran sanctions 52 American officials in relation to the “terrorist act” 
On January 8, 2022, Iran imposed sanctions on 52 United States officials, many of them from the military, adding to its blacklist of individuals whom it says played a role in the 2020 assassination of Major General Qasem Soleimani. US Chairman of the Joint Chiefs of Staff Mark Milley, Central Command chief Kenneth McKenzie, Pentagon officials, and commanders in several US bases across the region are among individuals targeted by the sanctions.

A year earlier, Iran had imposed sanctions on former US President Donald Trump, his Secretary of State Mike Pompeo and eight others who played a role in the killing of Soleimani near Baghdad airport in Iraq. It had also sought their arrest through Interpol, the international police organisation.

Iranian president Ebrahim Raisi said Trump, Pompeo and others must be tried in a “fair court”.

On May 25, 2022, the US imposed sanctions on Iran's Revolutionary Guards' Quds Force, accusing it of being part of a Russian-backed oil smuggling and money laundering network.

Economic relations 

Trade between Iran and the United States reached $623 million in 2008. According to the United States Census Bureau, American exports to Iran reached $93 million in 2007 and $537 million in 2008. American imports from Iran decreased from $148 million in 2007 to $86 million in 2008. This data does not include trade conducted through third countries to circumvent the trade embargo. It has been reported that the United States Treasury Department has granted nearly 10,000 special licenses to American companies over the past decade to conduct business with Iran.

US exports to Iran include cigarettes (US$73 million), corn (US$68 million); chemical wood pulp, soda or sulfate (US$64 million); soybeans (US$43 million); medical equipment (US$27 million); vitamins (US$18 million); and vegetable seeds (US$12 million). In 2010, US exports to Iran dropped by 50% to $281.8 million.

In May 2013, US President Barack Obama lifted a trade embargo of communications equipment and software to non-government Iranians. In June 2013, the Obama administration expanded its sanctions against Iran, targeting its auto industry and, for the first time, its currency.

As of January 2014, the successful conclusion and implementation of an interim diplomatic agreement restricting Iranian nuclear development, negotiated between Iran and major world powers in Geneva, has led to the release of some of Iran's frozen overseas assets as well as a partial lifting of sanctions previously placed upon Iranian trade in automotive parts, petrochemicals, and precious metals. The United States government has also pledged to continue renewing the exemptions to oil sanctions currently enjoyed by states such as India and South Korea, key customers of the Iranian oil sector. Restrictions placed upon the insurance against loss of Iranian seagoing vessels have also been waived at the completion of the 2013 agreements in Geneva.

According to a 2014 study by the National Iranian American Council, sanctions cost the US over $175 billion in lost trade and 279,000 lost job opportunities.

According to Business Monitor International:

On 22 April 2019, under the Trump administration, the U.S. demanded that buyers of Iranian oil stop purchases or face economic penalties, announcing that the six-month sanction exemptions for China, India, Japan, South Korea and Turkey instated a year prior would not be renewed and would end by 1 May. The move was seen as an attempt to completely stifle Iran's oil exports. Iran insisted the sanctions were illegal and that it had attached "no value or credibility" to the waivers. U.S. Secretary of State Mike Pompeo said President Trump's decision not to renew the waivers showed his administration was "dramatically accelerating our pressure campaign in a calibrated way that meets our national security objectives while maintaining well supplied global oil markets". On 30 April, Iran stated it would continue to export oil despite U.S. pressure.

On 8 May 2019, exactly one year after the Trump administration withdrew the United States from the Joint Comprehensive Plan of Action, the U.S. imposed a new layer of duplicate sanctions on Iran, targeting its metal exports, a sector that generates 10 percent of its export revenue. The move came amid escalating tension in the region and just hours after Iran threatened to start enriching more uranium if it did not get relief from U.S. measures that are crippling its economy. The Trump administration has said the sanctions will only be lifted if Iran fundamentally changes its behavior and character.

On 24 June 2019, following continued escalations in the Strait of Hormuz, President Donald Trump announced new targeted sanctions against Iranian and IRGC leadership, including Supreme Leader Ali Khamenei and his office. IRGC targets included Naval commander Alireza Tangsiri, Aerospace commander Amir Ali Hajizadeh, and Ground commander Mohammad Pakpour, and others. U.S. Treasury Secretary Steven Mnuchin said the sanctions will block "billions" in assets.

On 8 July 2019, Iran claims to have surpassed the nuclear enrichment level set during the 2015 Iran Deal.

The US Treasury Department Financial Crimes Enforcement Network imposed a measure that further prohibits the US banking system from use by an Iranian bank, thereby requiring US banks to step up due diligence on the accounts in their custody.

The US Department of Treasury's Office of Foreign Assets Control (OFAC) blacklisted four Iranian metal sector organizations along with their foreign subsidiaries, on 23 July 2020. One German subsidiary and three in the United Arab Emirates – owned and controlled by Iran's biggest steel manufacturer, Mobarakeh Steel Company – were also blacklisted by Washington for yielding millions of dollars for Iran's aluminum, steel, iron, and copper sectors. The sanctions froze all US assets controlled by the companies in question and further prohibited Americans from associating with them.

On October 8, 2020, the U.S. Treasury Department placed sanctions on 18 Iranian banks. Any American connection to these banks is to be blocked and reported to the Office of Foreign Assets Control, and, 45 days after the sanctions take effect, anyone transacting with these banks may "be subject to an enforcement action." Treasury Secretary Steven Mnuchin said the goal was to pressure Iran to end nuclear activities and terrorist funding.

On 30 October 2020, it was revealed that the US had "seized Iranian missiles shipped to Yemen", and it had "sold 1.1 million barrels of previously seized Iranian oil that was bound for Venezuela" in two shipments: the Liberia-flagged Euroforce and Singapore-flagged Maersk Progress, and sanctioned 11 new Iranian entities.

See also 
 2011–2012 Strait of Hormuz dispute
 American Iranian Council
 Support for military action against Iran
 Carter Doctrine
 Chicago's Persian heritage crisis
 Embassy of the United States, Tehran
 Going to Tehran
 United States and the United Nations
 Iran–America Society
 Iran and state-sponsored terrorism
 Iran nuclear deal framework
 Iranian Americans
 Iran–United States relations after 1979
 Joint Comprehensive Plan of Action
 Lawrence Franklin espionage scandal
 List of ambassadors of Iran to the United States
 Famous Americans in Iran
 Little Satan
 Global arrogance
 Opposition to military action against Iran
 Shia crescent
 Tehrangeles
 Executive Order 12170
 Academic relations between Iran and the United States
 United States cultural diplomacy in Iran

Footnotes

References

Further reading 
 Afrasiabi, Kaveh L. and Abbas Maleki, Iran's Foreign Policy After September 11. Booksurge, 2008.
 Aliyev, Tural. "The Evaluation of the Nuclear Weapon Agreement with Iran in the Perspective of the Difference Between Obama and Trump's Administration." R&S-Research Studies Anatolia Journal 4.1: 30–40. online
 Alvandi, Roham. Nixon, Kissinger, and the Shah: The United States and Iran in the Cold War (Oxford University Press, 2016).
 
 Blight, James G. and Janet M. Lang, et al. Becoming Enemies: U.S.-Iran Relations and the Iran-Iraq War, 1979–1988. (Lanham, MD: Rowman and Littlefield, 2014).
 Clinton, Hillary Rodham. Hard Choices (2014) under Obama; pp 416–446.
 Collier, David R. Democracy and the nature of American influence in Iran, 1941-1979 (Syracuse University Press, 2017.)
 Cooper, Andrew Scott. The Oil Kings: How the U.S., Iran, and Saudi Arabia Changed the Balance of Power in the Middle East, 2011, .
 Cottam, Richard W. "Human rights in Iran under the Shah." Case Western Reserve Journal of International Law 12 (1980): 121+ online.
 Cottam, Richard W. Iran and the United States: A Cold War Case Study (1988) on the fall of the Shah
 Crist, David. The Twilight War: The Secret History of America's Thirty-Year Conflict with Iran, Penguin Press, 2012.
 Cronin, Stephanie. The making of modern Iran: state and society under Riza Shah, 1921-1941 (Routledge, 2003).
 Emery, Christian. US Foreign Policy and the Iranian Revolution: The Cold War Dynamics of Engagement and Strategic Alliance. Palgrave Macmillan, 2013.
 Gasiorowski, Mark J. "U.S. Perceptions of the Communist Threat in Iran during the Mossadegh Era." Journal of Cold War Studies 21.3 (2019): 185–221. online
 Ghazvinian, John. America and Iran: A History, 1720 to the Present (2021), a major scholarly history excerpt
 Harris, David., The Crisis: the President, the Prophet, and the Shah—1979 and the Coming of Militant Islam, (2004).
 Heikal, Mohamed Hassanein. Iran: The Untold Story: An Insider's Account of America's Iranian Adventure and Its Consequences for the Future.  New York: Pantheon, 1982.
 Johns, Andrew L. "The Johnson Administration, the Shah of Iran, and the Changing Pattern of US-Iranian Relations, 1965–1967: 'Tired of Being Treated like a Schoolboy'." Journal of Cold War Studies 9.2 (2007): 64–94. online
 Katzman, Kenneth. Iran: Politics, Human Rights, and U.S. Policy. (2017).
 Kinch, Penelope. "The Iranian Crisis and the Dynamics of Advice and Intelligence in the Carter Administration." Journal of Intelligence History 6.2 (2006): 75–87.
 Ledeen, Michael A., and William H. Lewis. "Carter and the fall of the Shah: The inside story." Washington Quarterly 3.2 (1980): 3–40.
 Mabon, Simon. "Muting the trumpets of sabotage: Saudi Arabia, the US and the quest to securitize Iran." British Journal of Middle Eastern Studies 45.5 (2018): 742–759. online
 Moens, Alexander. "President Carter's Advisers and the Fall of the Shah." Political Science Quarterly 106.2 (1991): 211–237. online
 Offiler, Ben. US Foreign Policy and the Modernization of Iran: Kennedy, Johnson, Nixon and the Shah (Springer, 2015).
 Offiler, Ben. "“A spectacular irritant”: US–Iranian relations during the 1960s and the World's Best Dressed Man." The Historian (2021): 1-23, about Khaibar Khan Gudarzian. online
 Rostam-Kolayi, Jasamin. "The New Frontier Meets the White Revolution: The Peace Corps in Iran, 1962‒76." Iranian Studies 51.4 (2018): 587–612.
 Saikal, Amin. Iran Rising: The Survival and Future of the Islamic Republic (2019)
 Shannon, Michael K. "American–Iranian Alliances: International Education, Modernization, and Human Rights during the Pahlavi Era," Diplomatic History 39 (Sept. 2015), 661–88.
 Shannon, Michael K. Losing Hearts and Minds: American-Iranian Relations and International Education during the Cold War (2017) excerpt
 
 Summitt, April R. "For a white revolution: John F. Kennedy and the Shah of Iran." Middle East Journal 58.4 (2004): 560–575. online
 Torbat, Akbar E. "A Glance at US Policies toward Iran: Past A_GLANCE_AT_US_POLICIES_TOWARD_IRAN and Present," Journal of Iranian Research and Analysis, vol. 20, no. 1 (April 2004), pp. 85–94.
 Waehlisch, Martin. "The Iran-United States Dispute, the Strait of Hormuz, and International Law," Yale Journal of International Law, Vol. 37 (Spring 2012), pp. 23–34.
 Wise, Harold Lee. Inside the Danger Zone: The U.S. Military in the Persian Gulf 1987–88. (Annapolis: Naval Institute Press, 2007).
 Wright, Steven. The United States and Persian Gulf Security: The Foundations of the War on Terror. (Ithaca Press, 2007).

Historiography
 Schayegh, Cyrus. “‘Seeing Like a State’: An Essay on the Historiography of Modern Iran.” International Journal of Middle East Studies 42#1 (2010): 37–61.
 Shannon, Kelly J. "Approaching the Islamic World". Diplomatic History 44.3 (2020): 387–408, historical focus on US views of Iran.
 Shannon, Matthew K. "Reading Iran: American academics and the last shah." Iranian Studies 51.2 (2018): 289–316. online

External links 

 Timeline – The New York Times
 Virtual Embassy of the United States in Iran
 Articles and debates about Iran by Council on Foreign Relations
 US-Iran Relations by parstimes.com

Videos
 On The Same Page: America's Middle East Allies and Regional Threats - Foundation for Defense of Democracies — 1/15/2021
 UAE Minister of State Yousef Al Otaiba
 Bahrain Ambassador to U.S. Rashid al-Khalifa
 Israel Ambassador to US Ron Dermer

 
Articles containing video clips
United States
Bilateral relations of the United States